

446001–446100 

|-bgcolor=#E9E9E9
| 446001 ||  || — || August 29, 2006 || Catalina || CSS || — || align=right | 4.4 km || 
|-id=002 bgcolor=#E9E9E9
| 446002 ||  || — || January 7, 2013 || Kitt Peak || Spacewatch || — || align=right | 1.5 km || 
|-id=003 bgcolor=#E9E9E9
| 446003 ||  || — || September 28, 2003 || Kitt Peak || Spacewatch || (5) || align=right data-sort-value="0.69" | 690 m || 
|-id=004 bgcolor=#d6d6d6
| 446004 ||  || — || January 18, 2013 || Mount Lemmon || Mount Lemmon Survey || — || align=right | 2.7 km || 
|-id=005 bgcolor=#E9E9E9
| 446005 ||  || — || March 3, 2009 || Mount Lemmon || Mount Lemmon Survey || — || align=right data-sort-value="0.94" | 940 m || 
|-id=006 bgcolor=#E9E9E9
| 446006 ||  || — || February 6, 2000 || Catalina || CSS || — || align=right | 1.5 km || 
|-id=007 bgcolor=#E9E9E9
| 446007 ||  || — || April 22, 2009 || Mount Lemmon || Mount Lemmon Survey || — || align=right | 2.1 km || 
|-id=008 bgcolor=#E9E9E9
| 446008 ||  || — || December 6, 2008 || Kitt Peak || Spacewatch || — || align=right | 1.6 km || 
|-id=009 bgcolor=#E9E9E9
| 446009 ||  || — || November 20, 2007 || Mount Lemmon || Mount Lemmon Survey || — || align=right | 1.4 km || 
|-id=010 bgcolor=#FA8072
| 446010 ||  || — || March 3, 2006 || Kitt Peak || Spacewatch || — || align=right | 1.4 km || 
|-id=011 bgcolor=#E9E9E9
| 446011 ||  || — || October 10, 2007 || Mount Lemmon || Mount Lemmon Survey || — || align=right | 1.3 km || 
|-id=012 bgcolor=#E9E9E9
| 446012 ||  || — || October 31, 2011 || Mount Lemmon || Mount Lemmon Survey || — || align=right | 2.1 km || 
|-id=013 bgcolor=#E9E9E9
| 446013 ||  || — || April 4, 2005 || Catalina || CSS || — || align=right | 1.4 km || 
|-id=014 bgcolor=#E9E9E9
| 446014 ||  || — || February 17, 2004 || Kitt Peak || Spacewatch || — || align=right | 2.8 km || 
|-id=015 bgcolor=#E9E9E9
| 446015 ||  || — || October 3, 2003 || Kitt Peak || Spacewatch || EUN || align=right | 1.4 km || 
|-id=016 bgcolor=#E9E9E9
| 446016 ||  || — || October 29, 2008 || Mount Lemmon || Mount Lemmon Survey || MAR || align=right | 1.2 km || 
|-id=017 bgcolor=#E9E9E9
| 446017 ||  || — || November 3, 2007 || Kitt Peak || Spacewatch || — || align=right | 1.3 km || 
|-id=018 bgcolor=#d6d6d6
| 446018 ||  || — || February 7, 2013 || Kitt Peak || Spacewatch || — || align=right | 2.6 km || 
|-id=019 bgcolor=#E9E9E9
| 446019 ||  || — || April 17, 2005 || Kitt Peak || Spacewatch || — || align=right | 1.3 km || 
|-id=020 bgcolor=#fefefe
| 446020 ||  || — || December 1, 2008 || Kitt Peak || Spacewatch || NYS || align=right data-sort-value="0.59" | 590 m || 
|-id=021 bgcolor=#E9E9E9
| 446021 ||  || — || January 17, 2013 || Catalina || CSS || — || align=right | 2.5 km || 
|-id=022 bgcolor=#E9E9E9
| 446022 ||  || — || September 30, 2003 || Kitt Peak || Spacewatch || — || align=right | 1.00 km || 
|-id=023 bgcolor=#E9E9E9
| 446023 ||  || — || December 30, 2008 || Mount Lemmon || Mount Lemmon Survey || — || align=right | 1.0 km || 
|-id=024 bgcolor=#E9E9E9
| 446024 ||  || — || October 10, 2007 || Mount Lemmon || Mount Lemmon Survey || — || align=right | 1.2 km || 
|-id=025 bgcolor=#fefefe
| 446025 ||  || — || December 2, 2008 || Kitt Peak || Spacewatch || — || align=right data-sort-value="0.83" | 830 m || 
|-id=026 bgcolor=#E9E9E9
| 446026 ||  || — || November 5, 2007 || Kitt Peak || Spacewatch || — || align=right | 1.2 km || 
|-id=027 bgcolor=#fefefe
| 446027 ||  || — || October 5, 2004 || Kitt Peak || Spacewatch || MAS || align=right data-sort-value="0.62" | 620 m || 
|-id=028 bgcolor=#E9E9E9
| 446028 ||  || — || November 9, 2007 || Kitt Peak || Spacewatch || MRX || align=right | 1.2 km || 
|-id=029 bgcolor=#fefefe
| 446029 ||  || — || October 14, 2004 || Kitt Peak || Spacewatch || V || align=right data-sort-value="0.79" | 790 m || 
|-id=030 bgcolor=#E9E9E9
| 446030 ||  || — || October 10, 2007 || Kitt Peak || Spacewatch || — || align=right | 1.5 km || 
|-id=031 bgcolor=#E9E9E9
| 446031 ||  || — || April 12, 2004 || Kitt Peak || Spacewatch || DOR || align=right | 2.0 km || 
|-id=032 bgcolor=#d6d6d6
| 446032 ||  || — || January 10, 2008 || Mount Lemmon || Mount Lemmon Survey || — || align=right | 2.3 km || 
|-id=033 bgcolor=#E9E9E9
| 446033 ||  || — || February 27, 2009 || Kitt Peak || Spacewatch || (5) || align=right data-sort-value="0.78" | 780 m || 
|-id=034 bgcolor=#E9E9E9
| 446034 ||  || — || February 22, 2009 || Kitt Peak || Spacewatch || — || align=right | 1.2 km || 
|-id=035 bgcolor=#E9E9E9
| 446035 ||  || — || September 17, 2006 || Kitt Peak || Spacewatch || — || align=right | 1.6 km || 
|-id=036 bgcolor=#E9E9E9
| 446036 ||  || — || March 19, 2009 || Mount Lemmon || Mount Lemmon Survey || — || align=right | 1.1 km || 
|-id=037 bgcolor=#E9E9E9
| 446037 ||  || — || March 18, 2004 || Kitt Peak || Spacewatch || — || align=right | 2.1 km || 
|-id=038 bgcolor=#d6d6d6
| 446038 ||  || — || January 17, 2013 || Mount Lemmon || Mount Lemmon Survey || — || align=right | 2.4 km || 
|-id=039 bgcolor=#E9E9E9
| 446039 ||  || — || November 4, 2007 || Mount Lemmon || Mount Lemmon Survey || NEM || align=right | 2.6 km || 
|-id=040 bgcolor=#d6d6d6
| 446040 ||  || — || February 22, 2007 || Mount Lemmon || Mount Lemmon Survey || — || align=right | 2.7 km || 
|-id=041 bgcolor=#d6d6d6
| 446041 ||  || — || March 8, 2008 || Mount Lemmon || Mount Lemmon Survey || — || align=right | 3.6 km || 
|-id=042 bgcolor=#E9E9E9
| 446042 ||  || — || September 26, 2006 || Mount Lemmon || Mount Lemmon Survey || — || align=right | 1.7 km || 
|-id=043 bgcolor=#E9E9E9
| 446043 ||  || — || January 19, 2004 || Kitt Peak || Spacewatch || — || align=right | 1.2 km || 
|-id=044 bgcolor=#fefefe
| 446044 ||  || — || January 15, 2009 || Kitt Peak || Spacewatch || MAS || align=right data-sort-value="0.69" | 690 m || 
|-id=045 bgcolor=#d6d6d6
| 446045 ||  || — || August 23, 2004 || Kitt Peak || Spacewatch || — || align=right | 3.5 km || 
|-id=046 bgcolor=#E9E9E9
| 446046 ||  || — || August 27, 2006 || Kitt Peak || Spacewatch || — || align=right | 2.0 km || 
|-id=047 bgcolor=#fefefe
| 446047 ||  || — || May 1, 2006 || Kitt Peak || Spacewatch || — || align=right data-sort-value="0.88" | 880 m || 
|-id=048 bgcolor=#E9E9E9
| 446048 ||  || — || November 5, 2007 || Kitt Peak || Spacewatch || — || align=right | 1.3 km || 
|-id=049 bgcolor=#E9E9E9
| 446049 ||  || — || March 17, 2004 || Kitt Peak || Spacewatch || AGN || align=right | 1.0 km || 
|-id=050 bgcolor=#fefefe
| 446050 ||  || — || December 5, 2008 || Kitt Peak || Spacewatch || NYS || align=right data-sort-value="0.72" | 720 m || 
|-id=051 bgcolor=#E9E9E9
| 446051 ||  || — || October 18, 2007 || Kitt Peak || Spacewatch || (5) || align=right data-sort-value="0.78" | 780 m || 
|-id=052 bgcolor=#E9E9E9
| 446052 ||  || — || September 12, 2007 || Catalina || CSS || — || align=right data-sort-value="0.95" | 950 m || 
|-id=053 bgcolor=#fefefe
| 446053 ||  || — || February 10, 2002 || Socorro || LINEAR || MAS || align=right data-sort-value="0.85" | 850 m || 
|-id=054 bgcolor=#E9E9E9
| 446054 ||  || — || February 29, 2004 || Kitt Peak || Spacewatch || AEO || align=right | 1.2 km || 
|-id=055 bgcolor=#E9E9E9
| 446055 ||  || — || December 15, 2007 || Kitt Peak || Spacewatch || — || align=right | 1.8 km || 
|-id=056 bgcolor=#E9E9E9
| 446056 ||  || — || September 27, 2011 || Mount Lemmon || Mount Lemmon Survey || — || align=right | 1.7 km || 
|-id=057 bgcolor=#E9E9E9
| 446057 ||  || — || February 29, 2004 || Kitt Peak || Spacewatch || — || align=right | 2.2 km || 
|-id=058 bgcolor=#d6d6d6
| 446058 ||  || — || September 16, 2009 || Kitt Peak || Spacewatch || — || align=right | 3.4 km || 
|-id=059 bgcolor=#E9E9E9
| 446059 ||  || — || February 3, 2009 || Kitt Peak || Spacewatch || — || align=right | 1.0 km || 
|-id=060 bgcolor=#E9E9E9
| 446060 ||  || — || March 14, 2004 || Socorro || LINEAR || 526 || align=right | 2.8 km || 
|-id=061 bgcolor=#E9E9E9
| 446061 ||  || — || April 24, 2000 || Kitt Peak || Spacewatch || — || align=right | 1.9 km || 
|-id=062 bgcolor=#fefefe
| 446062 ||  || — || October 31, 2008 || Catalina || CSS || — || align=right | 1.1 km || 
|-id=063 bgcolor=#E9E9E9
| 446063 ||  || — || April 15, 2001 || Kitt Peak || Spacewatch || — || align=right | 1.4 km || 
|-id=064 bgcolor=#E9E9E9
| 446064 ||  || — || November 19, 2007 || Kitt Peak || Spacewatch || — || align=right | 1.2 km || 
|-id=065 bgcolor=#fefefe
| 446065 ||  || — || November 20, 2004 || Kitt Peak || Spacewatch || — || align=right data-sort-value="0.94" | 940 m || 
|-id=066 bgcolor=#d6d6d6
| 446066 ||  || — || October 7, 2005 || Kitt Peak || Spacewatch || — || align=right | 2.7 km || 
|-id=067 bgcolor=#E9E9E9
| 446067 ||  || — || October 19, 2006 || Kitt Peak || Spacewatch || AGN || align=right | 1.2 km || 
|-id=068 bgcolor=#E9E9E9
| 446068 ||  || — || August 27, 2006 || Kitt Peak || Spacewatch || — || align=right | 1.9 km || 
|-id=069 bgcolor=#E9E9E9
| 446069 ||  || — || December 31, 2007 || Kitt Peak || Spacewatch || — || align=right | 1.8 km || 
|-id=070 bgcolor=#E9E9E9
| 446070 ||  || — || September 19, 2006 || Catalina || CSS || — || align=right | 2.8 km || 
|-id=071 bgcolor=#d6d6d6
| 446071 ||  || — || February 14, 2013 || Kitt Peak || Spacewatch || — || align=right | 2.5 km || 
|-id=072 bgcolor=#E9E9E9
| 446072 ||  || — || January 11, 2008 || Mount Lemmon || Mount Lemmon Survey || — || align=right | 2.2 km || 
|-id=073 bgcolor=#E9E9E9
| 446073 ||  || — || November 15, 1998 || Kitt Peak || Spacewatch || — || align=right | 1.4 km || 
|-id=074 bgcolor=#d6d6d6
| 446074 ||  || — || March 10, 2002 || Cima Ekar || ADAS || — || align=right | 2.3 km || 
|-id=075 bgcolor=#E9E9E9
| 446075 ||  || — || April 24, 2009 || Mount Lemmon || Mount Lemmon Survey || — || align=right | 1.8 km || 
|-id=076 bgcolor=#E9E9E9
| 446076 ||  || — || November 2, 2011 || Mount Lemmon || Mount Lemmon Survey || — || align=right | 1.4 km || 
|-id=077 bgcolor=#fefefe
| 446077 ||  || — || November 17, 2004 || Campo Imperatore || CINEOS || NYS || align=right data-sort-value="0.67" | 670 m || 
|-id=078 bgcolor=#E9E9E9
| 446078 ||  || — || February 19, 2009 || Kitt Peak || Spacewatch || — || align=right | 1.3 km || 
|-id=079 bgcolor=#d6d6d6
| 446079 ||  || — || April 8, 2008 || Mount Lemmon || Mount Lemmon Survey || — || align=right | 2.6 km || 
|-id=080 bgcolor=#E9E9E9
| 446080 ||  || — || October 2, 2006 || Mount Lemmon || Mount Lemmon Survey || — || align=right | 2.2 km || 
|-id=081 bgcolor=#d6d6d6
| 446081 ||  || — || February 8, 2013 || XuYi || PMO NEO || — || align=right | 2.8 km || 
|-id=082 bgcolor=#E9E9E9
| 446082 ||  || — || September 14, 2006 || Kitt Peak || Spacewatch || MRX || align=right | 1.1 km || 
|-id=083 bgcolor=#E9E9E9
| 446083 ||  || — || December 29, 2003 || Kitt Peak || Spacewatch || — || align=right | 1.5 km || 
|-id=084 bgcolor=#E9E9E9
| 446084 ||  || — || October 20, 2007 || Mount Lemmon || Mount Lemmon Survey || — || align=right | 1.3 km || 
|-id=085 bgcolor=#fefefe
| 446085 ||  || — || December 1, 2008 || Mount Lemmon || Mount Lemmon Survey || — || align=right | 1.1 km || 
|-id=086 bgcolor=#fefefe
| 446086 ||  || — || December 14, 2004 || Kitt Peak || Spacewatch || — || align=right data-sort-value="0.70" | 700 m || 
|-id=087 bgcolor=#d6d6d6
| 446087 ||  || — || November 3, 2005 || Mount Lemmon || Mount Lemmon Survey || — || align=right | 2.9 km || 
|-id=088 bgcolor=#E9E9E9
| 446088 ||  || — || September 15, 2007 || Mount Lemmon || Mount Lemmon Survey || — || align=right | 1.3 km || 
|-id=089 bgcolor=#E9E9E9
| 446089 ||  || — || September 10, 2007 || Kitt Peak || Spacewatch || — || align=right data-sort-value="0.92" | 920 m || 
|-id=090 bgcolor=#E9E9E9
| 446090 ||  || — || October 2, 2003 || Kitt Peak || Spacewatch || — || align=right data-sort-value="0.97" | 970 m || 
|-id=091 bgcolor=#E9E9E9
| 446091 ||  || — || September 23, 2006 || Kitt Peak || Spacewatch || — || align=right | 2.6 km || 
|-id=092 bgcolor=#E9E9E9
| 446092 ||  || — || April 16, 2005 || Kitt Peak || Spacewatch || — || align=right | 1.1 km || 
|-id=093 bgcolor=#E9E9E9
| 446093 ||  || — || October 10, 2007 || Mount Lemmon || Mount Lemmon Survey || (5) || align=right data-sort-value="0.93" | 930 m || 
|-id=094 bgcolor=#fefefe
| 446094 ||  || — || May 25, 2006 || Mount Lemmon || Mount Lemmon Survey || V || align=right data-sort-value="0.75" | 750 m || 
|-id=095 bgcolor=#E9E9E9
| 446095 ||  || — || December 16, 2007 || Mount Lemmon || Mount Lemmon Survey || — || align=right | 2.2 km || 
|-id=096 bgcolor=#fefefe
| 446096 ||  || — || November 16, 2000 || Kitt Peak || Spacewatch || — || align=right | 1.4 km || 
|-id=097 bgcolor=#d6d6d6
| 446097 ||  || — || March 10, 2002 || Kitt Peak || Spacewatch || — || align=right | 2.3 km || 
|-id=098 bgcolor=#E9E9E9
| 446098 ||  || — || May 7, 2005 || Kitt Peak || Spacewatch || — || align=right | 1.7 km || 
|-id=099 bgcolor=#E9E9E9
| 446099 ||  || — || September 28, 2006 || Mount Lemmon || Mount Lemmon Survey || — || align=right | 2.0 km || 
|-id=100 bgcolor=#d6d6d6
| 446100 ||  || — || September 12, 2010 || Mount Lemmon || Mount Lemmon Survey || — || align=right | 2.7 km || 
|}

446101–446200 

|-bgcolor=#E9E9E9
| 446101 ||  || — || October 21, 2011 || Kitt Peak || Spacewatch || WIT || align=right data-sort-value="0.91" | 910 m || 
|-id=102 bgcolor=#E9E9E9
| 446102 ||  || — || December 4, 2007 || Kitt Peak || Spacewatch || — || align=right | 2.1 km || 
|-id=103 bgcolor=#d6d6d6
| 446103 ||  || — || July 27, 2009 || Catalina || CSS || — || align=right | 4.3 km || 
|-id=104 bgcolor=#E9E9E9
| 446104 ||  || — || March 18, 2009 || Kitt Peak || Spacewatch || — || align=right | 1.1 km || 
|-id=105 bgcolor=#fefefe
| 446105 ||  || — || August 29, 2011 || Siding Spring || SSS || — || align=right data-sort-value="0.78" | 780 m || 
|-id=106 bgcolor=#E9E9E9
| 446106 ||  || — || February 13, 2004 || Kitt Peak || Spacewatch || — || align=right | 2.2 km || 
|-id=107 bgcolor=#E9E9E9
| 446107 ||  || — || January 12, 2008 || Kitt Peak || Spacewatch || — || align=right | 2.4 km || 
|-id=108 bgcolor=#E9E9E9
| 446108 ||  || — || March 29, 2000 || Kitt Peak || Spacewatch || — || align=right | 1.8 km || 
|-id=109 bgcolor=#fefefe
| 446109 ||  || — || January 17, 2013 || Mount Lemmon || Mount Lemmon Survey || — || align=right data-sort-value="0.86" | 860 m || 
|-id=110 bgcolor=#E9E9E9
| 446110 ||  || — || November 19, 2003 || Kitt Peak || Spacewatch || — || align=right | 1.6 km || 
|-id=111 bgcolor=#E9E9E9
| 446111 ||  || — || February 28, 2009 || Kitt Peak || Spacewatch || — || align=right | 1.1 km || 
|-id=112 bgcolor=#E9E9E9
| 446112 ||  || — || January 31, 2009 || Kitt Peak || Spacewatch || GEF || align=right | 1.3 km || 
|-id=113 bgcolor=#d6d6d6
| 446113 ||  || — || June 15, 2009 || Mount Lemmon || Mount Lemmon Survey || — || align=right | 3.1 km || 
|-id=114 bgcolor=#E9E9E9
| 446114 ||  || — || March 8, 2000 || Kitt Peak || Spacewatch || EUN || align=right | 1.4 km || 
|-id=115 bgcolor=#fefefe
| 446115 ||  || — || February 11, 2002 || Socorro || LINEAR || MAS || align=right data-sort-value="0.77" | 770 m || 
|-id=116 bgcolor=#E9E9E9
| 446116 ||  || — || November 9, 2007 || Kitt Peak || Spacewatch || — || align=right | 1.0 km || 
|-id=117 bgcolor=#d6d6d6
| 446117 ||  || — || October 28, 2006 || Mount Lemmon || Mount Lemmon Survey || KOR || align=right | 1.1 km || 
|-id=118 bgcolor=#d6d6d6
| 446118 ||  || — || February 26, 2008 || Mount Lemmon || Mount Lemmon Survey || — || align=right | 2.1 km || 
|-id=119 bgcolor=#d6d6d6
| 446119 ||  || — || September 30, 2005 || Mount Lemmon || Mount Lemmon Survey || — || align=right | 2.1 km || 
|-id=120 bgcolor=#E9E9E9
| 446120 ||  || — || October 5, 2002 || Kitt Peak || Spacewatch || — || align=right | 1.4 km || 
|-id=121 bgcolor=#d6d6d6
| 446121 ||  || — || January 22, 2013 || Mount Lemmon || Mount Lemmon Survey || EOS || align=right | 1.8 km || 
|-id=122 bgcolor=#d6d6d6
| 446122 ||  || — || February 7, 2008 || Kitt Peak || Spacewatch || — || align=right | 2.1 km || 
|-id=123 bgcolor=#E9E9E9
| 446123 ||  || — || October 3, 2006 || Mount Lemmon || Mount Lemmon Survey || HOF || align=right | 2.6 km || 
|-id=124 bgcolor=#d6d6d6
| 446124 ||  || — || March 8, 2008 || Kitt Peak || Spacewatch || — || align=right | 2.6 km || 
|-id=125 bgcolor=#d6d6d6
| 446125 ||  || — || March 9, 2002 || Kitt Peak || Spacewatch || — || align=right | 3.0 km || 
|-id=126 bgcolor=#d6d6d6
| 446126 ||  || — || May 3, 2002 || Kitt Peak || Spacewatch || — || align=right | 3.6 km || 
|-id=127 bgcolor=#E9E9E9
| 446127 ||  || — || November 9, 2007 || Mount Lemmon || Mount Lemmon Survey || — || align=right | 1.4 km || 
|-id=128 bgcolor=#d6d6d6
| 446128 ||  || — || January 21, 2002 || Socorro || LINEAR || — || align=right | 3.5 km || 
|-id=129 bgcolor=#E9E9E9
| 446129 ||  || — || December 16, 2007 || Mount Lemmon || Mount Lemmon Survey || — || align=right | 2.0 km || 
|-id=130 bgcolor=#E9E9E9
| 446130 ||  || — || September 21, 2001 || Socorro || LINEAR || — || align=right | 3.5 km || 
|-id=131 bgcolor=#d6d6d6
| 446131 ||  || — || March 11, 2008 || Kitt Peak || Spacewatch || — || align=right | 3.1 km || 
|-id=132 bgcolor=#E9E9E9
| 446132 ||  || — || March 10, 2000 || Kitt Peak || Spacewatch || — || align=right | 1.2 km || 
|-id=133 bgcolor=#d6d6d6
| 446133 ||  || — || December 27, 2006 || Mount Lemmon || Mount Lemmon Survey || KOR || align=right | 1.4 km || 
|-id=134 bgcolor=#d6d6d6
| 446134 ||  || — || December 1, 1994 || Kitt Peak || Spacewatch || EOS || align=right | 2.0 km || 
|-id=135 bgcolor=#d6d6d6
| 446135 ||  || — || February 14, 2013 || Kitt Peak || Spacewatch || EOS || align=right | 1.8 km || 
|-id=136 bgcolor=#d6d6d6
| 446136 ||  || — || October 17, 2006 || Mount Lemmon || Mount Lemmon Survey || KOR || align=right | 1.6 km || 
|-id=137 bgcolor=#d6d6d6
| 446137 ||  || — || April 6, 2008 || Catalina || CSS || EOS || align=right | 2.6 km || 
|-id=138 bgcolor=#d6d6d6
| 446138 ||  || — || February 1, 2008 || Kitt Peak || Spacewatch || KOR || align=right | 1.4 km || 
|-id=139 bgcolor=#E9E9E9
| 446139 ||  || — || January 10, 2008 || Mount Lemmon || Mount Lemmon Survey || — || align=right | 2.4 km || 
|-id=140 bgcolor=#E9E9E9
| 446140 ||  || — || September 28, 2006 || Kitt Peak || Spacewatch || AGN || align=right | 1.2 km || 
|-id=141 bgcolor=#fefefe
| 446141 ||  || — || September 13, 2004 || Kitt Peak || Spacewatch || — || align=right data-sort-value="0.77" | 770 m || 
|-id=142 bgcolor=#d6d6d6
| 446142 ||  || — || April 13, 2008 || Mount Lemmon || Mount Lemmon Survey || — || align=right | 3.0 km || 
|-id=143 bgcolor=#E9E9E9
| 446143 ||  || — || November 18, 2003 || Kitt Peak || Spacewatch || — || align=right data-sort-value="0.93" | 930 m || 
|-id=144 bgcolor=#d6d6d6
| 446144 ||  || — || February 5, 2013 || Kitt Peak || Spacewatch || — || align=right | 2.5 km || 
|-id=145 bgcolor=#d6d6d6
| 446145 ||  || — || February 1, 2013 || Kitt Peak || Spacewatch || — || align=right | 4.1 km || 
|-id=146 bgcolor=#d6d6d6
| 446146 ||  || — || February 28, 2008 || Mount Lemmon || Mount Lemmon Survey || — || align=right | 2.3 km || 
|-id=147 bgcolor=#E9E9E9
| 446147 ||  || — || February 19, 2009 || Kitt Peak || Spacewatch || — || align=right | 1.2 km || 
|-id=148 bgcolor=#E9E9E9
| 446148 ||  || — || January 30, 2008 || Mount Lemmon || Mount Lemmon Survey || — || align=right | 2.1 km || 
|-id=149 bgcolor=#E9E9E9
| 446149 ||  || — || February 26, 2008 || Mount Lemmon || Mount Lemmon Survey || — || align=right | 1.9 km || 
|-id=150 bgcolor=#d6d6d6
| 446150 ||  || — || March 11, 2013 || Kitt Peak || Spacewatch || VER || align=right | 2.8 km || 
|-id=151 bgcolor=#d6d6d6
| 446151 ||  || — || March 10, 2008 || Kitt Peak || Spacewatch || — || align=right | 2.4 km || 
|-id=152 bgcolor=#d6d6d6
| 446152 ||  || — || March 13, 2007 || Mount Lemmon || Mount Lemmon Survey || HYG || align=right | 3.0 km || 
|-id=153 bgcolor=#E9E9E9
| 446153 ||  || — || October 16, 2006 || Catalina || CSS || NEM || align=right | 2.3 km || 
|-id=154 bgcolor=#E9E9E9
| 446154 ||  || — || December 30, 2007 || Catalina || CSS || MAR || align=right | 1.4 km || 
|-id=155 bgcolor=#E9E9E9
| 446155 ||  || — || April 19, 2009 || Mount Lemmon || Mount Lemmon Survey || — || align=right | 1.7 km || 
|-id=156 bgcolor=#d6d6d6
| 446156 ||  || — || November 1, 2005 || Mount Lemmon || Mount Lemmon Survey || — || align=right | 2.9 km || 
|-id=157 bgcolor=#d6d6d6
| 446157 ||  || — || March 28, 2008 || Kitt Peak || Spacewatch || — || align=right | 3.4 km || 
|-id=158 bgcolor=#d6d6d6
| 446158 ||  || — || August 4, 2010 || WISE || WISE || 7:4 || align=right | 3.8 km || 
|-id=159 bgcolor=#d6d6d6
| 446159 ||  || — || March 29, 2008 || Mount Lemmon || Mount Lemmon Survey || — || align=right | 2.0 km || 
|-id=160 bgcolor=#E9E9E9
| 446160 ||  || — || October 12, 2007 || Mount Lemmon || Mount Lemmon Survey || (5) || align=right data-sort-value="0.76" | 760 m || 
|-id=161 bgcolor=#E9E9E9
| 446161 ||  || — || March 19, 2004 || Socorro || LINEAR || — || align=right | 2.9 km || 
|-id=162 bgcolor=#E9E9E9
| 446162 ||  || — || September 30, 1997 || Kitt Peak || Spacewatch || — || align=right | 1.9 km || 
|-id=163 bgcolor=#d6d6d6
| 446163 ||  || — || February 6, 2002 || Socorro || LINEAR || — || align=right | 3.1 km || 
|-id=164 bgcolor=#E9E9E9
| 446164 ||  || — || October 20, 2006 || Mount Lemmon || Mount Lemmon Survey || HOF || align=right | 2.8 km || 
|-id=165 bgcolor=#d6d6d6
| 446165 ||  || — || September 11, 2004 || Kitt Peak || Spacewatch || — || align=right | 2.7 km || 
|-id=166 bgcolor=#d6d6d6
| 446166 ||  || — || April 5, 2003 || Kitt Peak || Spacewatch || — || align=right | 2.5 km || 
|-id=167 bgcolor=#d6d6d6
| 446167 ||  || — || March 21, 2002 || Kitt Peak || Spacewatch || — || align=right | 3.7 km || 
|-id=168 bgcolor=#fefefe
| 446168 ||  || — || December 13, 2004 || Kitt Peak || Spacewatch || — || align=right data-sort-value="0.78" | 780 m || 
|-id=169 bgcolor=#fefefe
| 446169 ||  || — || November 4, 2004 || Catalina || CSS || — || align=right data-sort-value="0.79" | 790 m || 
|-id=170 bgcolor=#d6d6d6
| 446170 ||  || — || March 30, 2008 || Kitt Peak || Spacewatch || — || align=right | 3.9 km || 
|-id=171 bgcolor=#d6d6d6
| 446171 ||  || — || April 14, 2008 || Kitt Peak || Spacewatch || — || align=right | 2.6 km || 
|-id=172 bgcolor=#d6d6d6
| 446172 ||  || — || February 8, 2007 || Mount Lemmon || Mount Lemmon Survey || — || align=right | 3.3 km || 
|-id=173 bgcolor=#d6d6d6
| 446173 ||  || — || April 25, 2003 || Kitt Peak || Spacewatch || EOS || align=right | 4.6 km || 
|-id=174 bgcolor=#d6d6d6
| 446174 ||  || — || September 30, 2005 || Mount Lemmon || Mount Lemmon Survey || KOR || align=right | 1.1 km || 
|-id=175 bgcolor=#E9E9E9
| 446175 ||  || — || October 24, 2011 || Mount Lemmon || Mount Lemmon Survey || AGN || align=right data-sort-value="0.93" | 930 m || 
|-id=176 bgcolor=#d6d6d6
| 446176 ||  || — || April 7, 2008 || Mount Lemmon || Mount Lemmon Survey || EOS || align=right | 1.8 km || 
|-id=177 bgcolor=#d6d6d6
| 446177 ||  || — || April 13, 2008 || Mount Lemmon || Mount Lemmon Survey || — || align=right | 3.1 km || 
|-id=178 bgcolor=#d6d6d6
| 446178 ||  || — || July 3, 2010 || WISE || WISE || — || align=right | 3.6 km || 
|-id=179 bgcolor=#E9E9E9
| 446179 ||  || — || February 13, 2008 || Mount Lemmon || Mount Lemmon Survey || MRX || align=right | 1.1 km || 
|-id=180 bgcolor=#d6d6d6
| 446180 ||  || — || March 11, 2013 || Mount Lemmon || Mount Lemmon Survey || — || align=right | 2.9 km || 
|-id=181 bgcolor=#d6d6d6
| 446181 ||  || — || January 28, 2007 || Kitt Peak || Spacewatch || THM || align=right | 2.2 km || 
|-id=182 bgcolor=#E9E9E9
| 446182 ||  || — || October 19, 2006 || Kitt Peak || Spacewatch || AGN || align=right | 1.1 km || 
|-id=183 bgcolor=#d6d6d6
| 446183 ||  || — || October 3, 2010 || Kitt Peak || Spacewatch || — || align=right | 2.9 km || 
|-id=184 bgcolor=#d6d6d6
| 446184 ||  || — || March 10, 2007 || Mount Lemmon || Mount Lemmon Survey || — || align=right | 2.9 km || 
|-id=185 bgcolor=#d6d6d6
| 446185 ||  || — || January 27, 2007 || Mount Lemmon || Mount Lemmon Survey || — || align=right | 2.6 km || 
|-id=186 bgcolor=#d6d6d6
| 446186 ||  || — || September 26, 2005 || Kitt Peak || Spacewatch || KOR || align=right | 1.3 km || 
|-id=187 bgcolor=#E9E9E9
| 446187 ||  || — || September 30, 2006 || Mount Lemmon || Mount Lemmon Survey || — || align=right | 2.6 km || 
|-id=188 bgcolor=#d6d6d6
| 446188 ||  || — || March 31, 2013 || Mount Lemmon || Mount Lemmon Survey || — || align=right | 4.1 km || 
|-id=189 bgcolor=#d6d6d6
| 446189 ||  || — || October 27, 2005 || Kitt Peak || Spacewatch || — || align=right | 2.9 km || 
|-id=190 bgcolor=#d6d6d6
| 446190 ||  || — || November 30, 2005 || Kitt Peak || Spacewatch || — || align=right | 2.9 km || 
|-id=191 bgcolor=#E9E9E9
| 446191 ||  || — || October 13, 2006 || Kitt Peak || Spacewatch || — || align=right | 2.1 km || 
|-id=192 bgcolor=#E9E9E9
| 446192 ||  || — || March 31, 2009 || Mount Lemmon || Mount Lemmon Survey || — || align=right | 2.3 km || 
|-id=193 bgcolor=#d6d6d6
| 446193 ||  || — || September 7, 2004 || Kitt Peak || Spacewatch || — || align=right | 2.5 km || 
|-id=194 bgcolor=#E9E9E9
| 446194 ||  || — || March 27, 2009 || Mount Lemmon || Mount Lemmon Survey || — || align=right | 1.6 km || 
|-id=195 bgcolor=#d6d6d6
| 446195 ||  || — || December 29, 2011 || Mount Lemmon || Mount Lemmon Survey || — || align=right | 2.9 km || 
|-id=196 bgcolor=#E9E9E9
| 446196 ||  || — || April 17, 2005 || Kitt Peak || Spacewatch || — || align=right | 1.7 km || 
|-id=197 bgcolor=#d6d6d6
| 446197 ||  || — || December 24, 2005 || Kitt Peak || Spacewatch || — || align=right | 2.9 km || 
|-id=198 bgcolor=#E9E9E9
| 446198 ||  || — || February 29, 2000 || Socorro || LINEAR || — || align=right | 1.6 km || 
|-id=199 bgcolor=#E9E9E9
| 446199 ||  || — || October 26, 2001 || Kitt Peak || Spacewatch || HOF || align=right | 2.7 km || 
|-id=200 bgcolor=#d6d6d6
| 446200 ||  || — || November 3, 2005 || Mount Lemmon || Mount Lemmon Survey || — || align=right | 2.9 km || 
|}

446201–446300 

|-bgcolor=#E9E9E9
| 446201 ||  || — || December 16, 2007 || Mount Lemmon || Mount Lemmon Survey || NEM || align=right | 2.3 km || 
|-id=202 bgcolor=#d6d6d6
| 446202 ||  || — || March 5, 2008 || Mount Lemmon || Mount Lemmon Survey || — || align=right | 3.3 km || 
|-id=203 bgcolor=#d6d6d6
| 446203 ||  || — || October 27, 2005 || Kitt Peak || Spacewatch || — || align=right | 3.0 km || 
|-id=204 bgcolor=#E9E9E9
| 446204 ||  || — || September 6, 1996 || Kitt Peak || Spacewatch || HOF || align=right | 2.6 km || 
|-id=205 bgcolor=#E9E9E9
| 446205 ||  || — || April 28, 2004 || Kitt Peak || Spacewatch || AST || align=right | 3.2 km || 
|-id=206 bgcolor=#d6d6d6
| 446206 ||  || — || May 28, 2003 || Kitt Peak || Spacewatch || EOS || align=right | 2.2 km || 
|-id=207 bgcolor=#d6d6d6
| 446207 ||  || — || November 7, 2010 || Mount Lemmon || Mount Lemmon Survey || — || align=right | 3.0 km || 
|-id=208 bgcolor=#d6d6d6
| 446208 ||  || — || March 8, 2008 || Kitt Peak || Spacewatch || — || align=right | 2.8 km || 
|-id=209 bgcolor=#E9E9E9
| 446209 ||  || — || March 16, 2004 || Kitt Peak || Spacewatch || AEO || align=right | 1.1 km || 
|-id=210 bgcolor=#E9E9E9
| 446210 ||  || — || October 14, 1998 || Caussols || ODAS || — || align=right | 3.1 km || 
|-id=211 bgcolor=#E9E9E9
| 446211 ||  || — || March 31, 2009 || Kitt Peak || Spacewatch || RAF || align=right data-sort-value="0.90" | 900 m || 
|-id=212 bgcolor=#E9E9E9
| 446212 ||  || — || March 23, 2004 || Kitt Peak || Spacewatch || — || align=right | 2.7 km || 
|-id=213 bgcolor=#d6d6d6
| 446213 ||  || — || February 23, 2007 || Kitt Peak || Spacewatch || — || align=right | 2.5 km || 
|-id=214 bgcolor=#d6d6d6
| 446214 ||  || — || March 12, 2007 || Kitt Peak || Spacewatch || — || align=right | 3.1 km || 
|-id=215 bgcolor=#d6d6d6
| 446215 ||  || — || February 6, 1997 || Kitt Peak || Spacewatch || — || align=right | 3.2 km || 
|-id=216 bgcolor=#E9E9E9
| 446216 ||  || — || September 29, 2011 || Mount Lemmon || Mount Lemmon Survey || ADE || align=right | 1.8 km || 
|-id=217 bgcolor=#d6d6d6
| 446217 ||  || — || December 4, 2005 || Kitt Peak || Spacewatch || — || align=right | 2.6 km || 
|-id=218 bgcolor=#d6d6d6
| 446218 ||  || — || November 22, 2005 || Kitt Peak || Spacewatch || — || align=right | 2.5 km || 
|-id=219 bgcolor=#d6d6d6
| 446219 ||  || — || January 17, 2007 || Kitt Peak || Spacewatch || — || align=right | 2.6 km || 
|-id=220 bgcolor=#d6d6d6
| 446220 ||  || — || January 29, 2007 || Kitt Peak || Spacewatch || — || align=right | 2.5 km || 
|-id=221 bgcolor=#E9E9E9
| 446221 ||  || — || April 12, 2005 || Kitt Peak || Spacewatch || — || align=right | 1.3 km || 
|-id=222 bgcolor=#d6d6d6
| 446222 ||  || — || January 28, 2007 || Mount Lemmon || Mount Lemmon Survey || — || align=right | 2.3 km || 
|-id=223 bgcolor=#d6d6d6
| 446223 ||  || — || November 30, 2005 || Mount Lemmon || Mount Lemmon Survey || — || align=right | 2.9 km || 
|-id=224 bgcolor=#d6d6d6
| 446224 ||  || — || November 10, 1996 || Kitt Peak || Spacewatch || KOR || align=right | 1.8 km || 
|-id=225 bgcolor=#E9E9E9
| 446225 ||  || — || September 19, 2006 || Kitt Peak || Spacewatch || — || align=right | 1.3 km || 
|-id=226 bgcolor=#d6d6d6
| 446226 ||  || — || October 4, 1999 || Kitt Peak || Spacewatch || — || align=right | 2.7 km || 
|-id=227 bgcolor=#d6d6d6
| 446227 ||  || — || March 13, 2007 || Kitt Peak || Spacewatch || — || align=right | 3.8 km || 
|-id=228 bgcolor=#d6d6d6
| 446228 ||  || — || April 17, 1996 || Kitt Peak || Spacewatch || — || align=right | 2.8 km || 
|-id=229 bgcolor=#d6d6d6
| 446229 ||  || — || May 3, 2008 || Mount Lemmon || Mount Lemmon Survey || — || align=right | 3.1 km || 
|-id=230 bgcolor=#d6d6d6
| 446230 ||  || — || November 30, 2005 || Kitt Peak || Spacewatch || — || align=right | 3.2 km || 
|-id=231 bgcolor=#d6d6d6
| 446231 ||  || — || March 28, 2008 || Mount Lemmon || Mount Lemmon Survey || — || align=right | 2.6 km || 
|-id=232 bgcolor=#E9E9E9
| 446232 ||  || — || September 19, 2006 || Kitt Peak || Spacewatch || — || align=right | 1.9 km || 
|-id=233 bgcolor=#d6d6d6
| 446233 ||  || — || October 25, 2005 || Kitt Peak || Spacewatch || EOS || align=right | 2.0 km || 
|-id=234 bgcolor=#d6d6d6
| 446234 ||  || — || August 25, 2004 || Kitt Peak || Spacewatch || — || align=right | 2.8 km || 
|-id=235 bgcolor=#d6d6d6
| 446235 ||  || — || November 11, 2010 || Catalina || CSS || — || align=right | 3.4 km || 
|-id=236 bgcolor=#d6d6d6
| 446236 ||  || — || October 12, 2004 || Kitt Peak || Spacewatch || — || align=right | 3.0 km || 
|-id=237 bgcolor=#d6d6d6
| 446237 ||  || — || February 27, 2007 || Kitt Peak || Spacewatch || THM || align=right | 2.2 km || 
|-id=238 bgcolor=#E9E9E9
| 446238 ||  || — || October 19, 2006 || Catalina || CSS || — || align=right | 2.5 km || 
|-id=239 bgcolor=#d6d6d6
| 446239 ||  || — || September 10, 2004 || Kitt Peak || Spacewatch || — || align=right | 2.6 km || 
|-id=240 bgcolor=#d6d6d6
| 446240 ||  || — || May 2, 2008 || Catalina || CSS || — || align=right | 4.4 km || 
|-id=241 bgcolor=#d6d6d6
| 446241 ||  || — || March 13, 2008 || Catalina || CSS || — || align=right | 4.2 km || 
|-id=242 bgcolor=#d6d6d6
| 446242 ||  || — || June 23, 2009 || Mount Lemmon || Mount Lemmon Survey || — || align=right | 3.7 km || 
|-id=243 bgcolor=#d6d6d6
| 446243 ||  || — || November 25, 2005 || Catalina || CSS || — || align=right | 3.6 km || 
|-id=244 bgcolor=#d6d6d6
| 446244 ||  || — || October 28, 2010 || Kitt Peak || Spacewatch || — || align=right | 4.1 km || 
|-id=245 bgcolor=#d6d6d6
| 446245 ||  || — || December 13, 2006 || Kitt Peak || Spacewatch || — || align=right | 2.6 km || 
|-id=246 bgcolor=#d6d6d6
| 446246 ||  || — || October 1, 2003 || Kitt Peak || Spacewatch || 7:4 || align=right | 3.2 km || 
|-id=247 bgcolor=#d6d6d6
| 446247 ||  || — || November 3, 2010 || Mount Lemmon || Mount Lemmon Survey || — || align=right | 3.8 km || 
|-id=248 bgcolor=#d6d6d6
| 446248 ||  || — || February 23, 2007 || Mount Lemmon || Mount Lemmon Survey || — || align=right | 1.9 km || 
|-id=249 bgcolor=#d6d6d6
| 446249 ||  || — || October 11, 2004 || Kitt Peak || Spacewatch || VER || align=right | 2.7 km || 
|-id=250 bgcolor=#d6d6d6
| 446250 ||  || — || October 25, 2005 || Mount Lemmon || Mount Lemmon Survey || EOS || align=right | 1.8 km || 
|-id=251 bgcolor=#d6d6d6
| 446251 ||  || — || September 4, 2010 || Kitt Peak || Spacewatch || — || align=right | 3.4 km || 
|-id=252 bgcolor=#d6d6d6
| 446252 ||  || — || March 12, 2007 || Mount Lemmon || Mount Lemmon Survey || — || align=right | 2.3 km || 
|-id=253 bgcolor=#d6d6d6
| 446253 ||  || — || September 15, 2009 || Kitt Peak || Spacewatch || — || align=right | 3.0 km || 
|-id=254 bgcolor=#d6d6d6
| 446254 ||  || — || April 24, 2008 || Kitt Peak || Spacewatch || — || align=right | 2.7 km || 
|-id=255 bgcolor=#E9E9E9
| 446255 ||  || — || September 17, 2006 || Kitt Peak || Spacewatch || — || align=right | 1.1 km || 
|-id=256 bgcolor=#E9E9E9
| 446256 ||  || — || January 10, 2008 || Kitt Peak || Spacewatch || — || align=right | 1.5 km || 
|-id=257 bgcolor=#d6d6d6
| 446257 ||  || — || May 28, 2008 || Mount Lemmon || Mount Lemmon Survey || — || align=right | 2.9 km || 
|-id=258 bgcolor=#d6d6d6
| 446258 ||  || — || October 5, 2004 || Kitt Peak || Spacewatch || — || align=right | 2.4 km || 
|-id=259 bgcolor=#d6d6d6
| 446259 ||  || — || November 11, 2005 || Kitt Peak || Spacewatch || — || align=right | 2.0 km || 
|-id=260 bgcolor=#d6d6d6
| 446260 ||  || — || October 24, 2005 || Kitt Peak || Spacewatch || THM || align=right | 1.9 km || 
|-id=261 bgcolor=#E9E9E9
| 446261 ||  || — || March 2, 2000 || Kitt Peak || Spacewatch || — || align=right data-sort-value="0.95" | 950 m || 
|-id=262 bgcolor=#E9E9E9
| 446262 ||  || — || November 21, 1998 || Kitt Peak || Spacewatch || — || align=right | 2.1 km || 
|-id=263 bgcolor=#d6d6d6
| 446263 ||  || — || October 30, 2006 || Mount Lemmon || Mount Lemmon Survey || — || align=right | 4.1 km || 
|-id=264 bgcolor=#d6d6d6
| 446264 ||  || — || September 16, 2009 || Mount Lemmon || Mount Lemmon Survey || — || align=right | 2.9 km || 
|-id=265 bgcolor=#E9E9E9
| 446265 ||  || — || November 3, 2011 || Kitt Peak || Spacewatch || — || align=right data-sort-value="0.92" | 920 m || 
|-id=266 bgcolor=#d6d6d6
| 446266 ||  || — || December 1, 2005 || Kitt Peak || Spacewatch || — || align=right | 3.4 km || 
|-id=267 bgcolor=#d6d6d6
| 446267 ||  || — || December 8, 2010 || Kitt Peak || Spacewatch || — || align=right | 3.6 km || 
|-id=268 bgcolor=#d6d6d6
| 446268 ||  || — || March 12, 2007 || Kitt Peak || Spacewatch || — || align=right | 3.1 km || 
|-id=269 bgcolor=#fefefe
| 446269 ||  || — || November 17, 2008 || Catalina || CSS || H || align=right data-sort-value="0.76" | 760 m || 
|-id=270 bgcolor=#fefefe
| 446270 ||  || — || February 26, 2011 || Kitt Peak || Spacewatch || — || align=right data-sort-value="0.66" | 660 m || 
|-id=271 bgcolor=#fefefe
| 446271 ||  || — || December 6, 2010 || Catalina || CSS || H || align=right data-sort-value="0.90" | 900 m || 
|-id=272 bgcolor=#fefefe
| 446272 ||  || — || February 22, 2011 || Kitt Peak || Spacewatch || — || align=right data-sort-value="0.57" | 570 m || 
|-id=273 bgcolor=#fefefe
| 446273 ||  || — || February 21, 2007 || Kitt Peak || Spacewatch || — || align=right data-sort-value="0.69" | 690 m || 
|-id=274 bgcolor=#fefefe
| 446274 ||  || — || February 25, 2007 || Mount Lemmon || Mount Lemmon Survey || NYS || align=right data-sort-value="0.65" | 650 m || 
|-id=275 bgcolor=#fefefe
| 446275 ||  || — || October 9, 2005 || Kitt Peak || Spacewatch || — || align=right data-sort-value="0.71" | 710 m || 
|-id=276 bgcolor=#fefefe
| 446276 ||  || — || March 23, 2006 || Catalina || CSS || H || align=right data-sort-value="0.63" | 630 m || 
|-id=277 bgcolor=#fefefe
| 446277 ||  || — || January 31, 2006 || Anderson Mesa || LONEOS || H || align=right data-sort-value="0.65" | 650 m || 
|-id=278 bgcolor=#fefefe
| 446278 ||  || — || October 8, 2007 || Catalina || CSS || H || align=right data-sort-value="0.88" | 880 m || 
|-id=279 bgcolor=#E9E9E9
| 446279 ||  || — || March 13, 2010 || Catalina || CSS || — || align=right | 1.0 km || 
|-id=280 bgcolor=#fefefe
| 446280 ||  || — || March 25, 2006 || Kitt Peak || Spacewatch || H || align=right data-sort-value="0.80" | 800 m || 
|-id=281 bgcolor=#fefefe
| 446281 ||  || — || March 29, 2004 || Kitt Peak || Spacewatch || — || align=right data-sort-value="0.68" | 680 m || 
|-id=282 bgcolor=#fefefe
| 446282 ||  || — || May 28, 2008 || Mount Lemmon || Mount Lemmon Survey || — || align=right data-sort-value="0.89" | 890 m || 
|-id=283 bgcolor=#fefefe
| 446283 ||  || — || January 28, 2007 || Mount Lemmon || Mount Lemmon Survey || — || align=right data-sort-value="0.64" | 640 m || 
|-id=284 bgcolor=#fefefe
| 446284 ||  || — || February 25, 2007 || Mount Lemmon || Mount Lemmon Survey || NYS || align=right data-sort-value="0.64" | 640 m || 
|-id=285 bgcolor=#E9E9E9
| 446285 ||  || — || April 2, 2006 || Kitt Peak || Spacewatch || — || align=right data-sort-value="0.98" | 980 m || 
|-id=286 bgcolor=#fefefe
| 446286 ||  || — || September 29, 2008 || Kitt Peak || Spacewatch || — || align=right data-sort-value="0.74" | 740 m || 
|-id=287 bgcolor=#fefefe
| 446287 ||  || — || March 27, 2011 || Kitt Peak || Spacewatch || — || align=right data-sort-value="0.67" | 670 m || 
|-id=288 bgcolor=#d6d6d6
| 446288 ||  || — || April 19, 1998 || Kitt Peak || Spacewatch || — || align=right | 1.4 km || 
|-id=289 bgcolor=#fefefe
| 446289 ||  || — || March 22, 2004 || Socorro || LINEAR || — || align=right data-sort-value="0.82" | 820 m || 
|-id=290 bgcolor=#fefefe
| 446290 ||  || — || December 20, 2009 || Kitt Peak || Spacewatch || — || align=right data-sort-value="0.68" | 680 m || 
|-id=291 bgcolor=#fefefe
| 446291 ||  || — || March 9, 2003 || Kitt Peak || Spacewatch || — || align=right data-sort-value="0.96" | 960 m || 
|-id=292 bgcolor=#E9E9E9
| 446292 ||  || — || April 9, 2006 || Kitt Peak || Spacewatch || (5) || align=right data-sort-value="0.74" | 740 m || 
|-id=293 bgcolor=#E9E9E9
| 446293 ||  || — || March 21, 2010 || Kitt Peak || Spacewatch || — || align=right | 1.3 km || 
|-id=294 bgcolor=#fefefe
| 446294 ||  || — || October 26, 2008 || Kitt Peak || Spacewatch || — || align=right | 1.1 km || 
|-id=295 bgcolor=#E9E9E9
| 446295 ||  || — || January 2, 2009 || Mount Lemmon || Mount Lemmon Survey || — || align=right | 2.0 km || 
|-id=296 bgcolor=#fefefe
| 446296 ||  || — || April 18, 2007 || Kitt Peak || Spacewatch || NYS || align=right data-sort-value="0.63" | 630 m || 
|-id=297 bgcolor=#fefefe
| 446297 ||  || — || April 5, 2000 || Anderson Mesa || LONEOS || — || align=right data-sort-value="0.67" | 670 m || 
|-id=298 bgcolor=#E9E9E9
| 446298 ||  || — || February 14, 2010 || Mount Lemmon || Mount Lemmon Survey || EUN || align=right | 1.1 km || 
|-id=299 bgcolor=#d6d6d6
| 446299 ||  || — || May 26, 2009 || Mount Lemmon || Mount Lemmon Survey || — || align=right | 3.0 km || 
|-id=300 bgcolor=#fefefe
| 446300 ||  || — || March 16, 2007 || Kitt Peak || Spacewatch || — || align=right data-sort-value="0.80" | 800 m || 
|}

446301–446400 

|-bgcolor=#fefefe
| 446301 ||  || — || February 21, 2007 || Kitt Peak || Spacewatch || — || align=right data-sort-value="0.70" | 700 m || 
|-id=302 bgcolor=#fefefe
| 446302 ||  || — || April 19, 2007 || Mount Lemmon || Mount Lemmon Survey || NYS || align=right data-sort-value="0.52" | 520 m || 
|-id=303 bgcolor=#fefefe
| 446303 ||  || — || June 26, 2011 || Mount Lemmon || Mount Lemmon Survey || NYS || align=right data-sort-value="0.79" | 790 m || 
|-id=304 bgcolor=#fefefe
| 446304 ||  || — || August 28, 2005 || Kitt Peak || Spacewatch || — || align=right data-sort-value="0.71" | 710 m || 
|-id=305 bgcolor=#E9E9E9
| 446305 ||  || — || January 31, 2010 || WISE || WISE || — || align=right | 2.2 km || 
|-id=306 bgcolor=#fefefe
| 446306 ||  || — || January 25, 2007 || Kitt Peak || Spacewatch || — || align=right data-sort-value="0.71" | 710 m || 
|-id=307 bgcolor=#fefefe
| 446307 ||  || — || March 19, 2007 || Mount Lemmon || Mount Lemmon Survey || — || align=right data-sort-value="0.83" | 830 m || 
|-id=308 bgcolor=#fefefe
| 446308 ||  || — || January 6, 2010 || Kitt Peak || Spacewatch || MAS || align=right data-sort-value="0.80" | 800 m || 
|-id=309 bgcolor=#fefefe
| 446309 ||  || — || April 11, 2007 || Kitt Peak || Spacewatch || — || align=right data-sort-value="0.81" | 810 m || 
|-id=310 bgcolor=#fefefe
| 446310 ||  || — || January 28, 2011 || Catalina || CSS || H || align=right | 1.1 km || 
|-id=311 bgcolor=#E9E9E9
| 446311 ||  || — || September 14, 2007 || Mount Lemmon || Mount Lemmon Survey || RAF || align=right data-sort-value="0.84" | 840 m || 
|-id=312 bgcolor=#fefefe
| 446312 ||  || — || March 10, 2007 || Mount Lemmon || Mount Lemmon Survey || — || align=right data-sort-value="0.65" | 650 m || 
|-id=313 bgcolor=#fefefe
| 446313 ||  || — || March 26, 2003 || Kitt Peak || Spacewatch || MAS || align=right data-sort-value="0.65" | 650 m || 
|-id=314 bgcolor=#fefefe
| 446314 ||  || — || December 25, 2005 || Mount Lemmon || Mount Lemmon Survey || — || align=right data-sort-value="0.84" | 840 m || 
|-id=315 bgcolor=#fefefe
| 446315 ||  || — || October 30, 2008 || Kitt Peak || Spacewatch || — || align=right | 1.1 km || 
|-id=316 bgcolor=#fefefe
| 446316 ||  || — || October 16, 2012 || Mount Lemmon || Mount Lemmon Survey || — || align=right data-sort-value="0.75" | 750 m || 
|-id=317 bgcolor=#fefefe
| 446317 ||  || — || July 25, 2008 || Siding Spring || SSS || — || align=right data-sort-value="0.83" | 830 m || 
|-id=318 bgcolor=#E9E9E9
| 446318 ||  || — || September 12, 2007 || Mount Lemmon || Mount Lemmon Survey || — || align=right data-sort-value="0.82" | 820 m || 
|-id=319 bgcolor=#E9E9E9
| 446319 ||  || — || September 13, 2007 || Mount Lemmon || Mount Lemmon Survey || — || align=right data-sort-value="0.87" | 870 m || 
|-id=320 bgcolor=#fefefe
| 446320 ||  || — || September 14, 2005 || Catalina || CSS || — || align=right data-sort-value="0.98" | 980 m || 
|-id=321 bgcolor=#fefefe
| 446321 ||  || — || March 23, 2003 || Kitt Peak || Spacewatch || NYS || align=right data-sort-value="0.64" | 640 m || 
|-id=322 bgcolor=#fefefe
| 446322 ||  || — || April 8, 2003 || Kitt Peak || Spacewatch || — || align=right data-sort-value="0.73" | 730 m || 
|-id=323 bgcolor=#E9E9E9
| 446323 ||  || — || March 14, 2005 || Mount Lemmon || Mount Lemmon Survey || — || align=right | 1.9 km || 
|-id=324 bgcolor=#E9E9E9
| 446324 ||  || — || January 22, 2010 || WISE || WISE || — || align=right | 2.1 km || 
|-id=325 bgcolor=#E9E9E9
| 446325 ||  || — || May 4, 2010 || Catalina || CSS || — || align=right | 1.1 km || 
|-id=326 bgcolor=#fefefe
| 446326 ||  || — || September 30, 2005 || Mount Lemmon || Mount Lemmon Survey || — || align=right data-sort-value="0.82" | 820 m || 
|-id=327 bgcolor=#fefefe
| 446327 ||  || — || February 21, 2007 || Mount Lemmon || Mount Lemmon Survey || NYS || align=right data-sort-value="0.73" | 730 m || 
|-id=328 bgcolor=#fefefe
| 446328 ||  || — || December 6, 2005 || Kitt Peak || Spacewatch || — || align=right data-sort-value="0.72" | 720 m || 
|-id=329 bgcolor=#fefefe
| 446329 ||  || — || February 27, 2001 || Cima Ekar || ADAS || H || align=right data-sort-value="0.73" | 730 m || 
|-id=330 bgcolor=#fefefe
| 446330 ||  || — || December 2, 2005 || Kitt Peak || Spacewatch || NYS || align=right data-sort-value="0.68" | 680 m || 
|-id=331 bgcolor=#fefefe
| 446331 ||  || — || March 20, 2010 || Mount Lemmon || Mount Lemmon Survey || — || align=right data-sort-value="0.87" | 870 m || 
|-id=332 bgcolor=#fefefe
| 446332 ||  || — || January 30, 2006 || Kitt Peak || Spacewatch || — || align=right | 1.3 km || 
|-id=333 bgcolor=#E9E9E9
| 446333 ||  || — || September 13, 2007 || Mount Lemmon || Mount Lemmon Survey || — || align=right data-sort-value="0.82" | 820 m || 
|-id=334 bgcolor=#fefefe
| 446334 ||  || — || July 1, 2011 || Mount Lemmon || Mount Lemmon Survey || — || align=right data-sort-value="0.59" | 590 m || 
|-id=335 bgcolor=#E9E9E9
| 446335 ||  || — || October 21, 1995 || Kitt Peak || Spacewatch || — || align=right | 1.0 km || 
|-id=336 bgcolor=#d6d6d6
| 446336 ||  || — || March 8, 2008 || Catalina || CSS || — || align=right | 3.0 km || 
|-id=337 bgcolor=#d6d6d6
| 446337 ||  || — || October 4, 2004 || Kitt Peak || Spacewatch || THB || align=right | 2.8 km || 
|-id=338 bgcolor=#fefefe
| 446338 ||  || — || December 20, 2009 || Mount Lemmon || Mount Lemmon Survey || NYS || align=right data-sort-value="0.61" | 610 m || 
|-id=339 bgcolor=#fefefe
| 446339 ||  || — || October 13, 2005 || Kitt Peak || Spacewatch || — || align=right | 2.1 km || 
|-id=340 bgcolor=#fefefe
| 446340 ||  || — || February 21, 2007 || Kitt Peak || Spacewatch || — || align=right data-sort-value="0.80" | 800 m || 
|-id=341 bgcolor=#d6d6d6
| 446341 ||  || — || March 23, 2003 || Kitt Peak || Spacewatch || — || align=right | 2.4 km || 
|-id=342 bgcolor=#E9E9E9
| 446342 ||  || — || July 6, 1997 || Kitt Peak || Spacewatch || — || align=right | 1.5 km || 
|-id=343 bgcolor=#fefefe
| 446343 ||  || — || December 5, 2005 || Kitt Peak || Spacewatch || NYS || align=right data-sort-value="0.58" | 580 m || 
|-id=344 bgcolor=#fefefe
| 446344 ||  || — || September 12, 2007 || Catalina || CSS || H || align=right data-sort-value="0.67" | 670 m || 
|-id=345 bgcolor=#fefefe
| 446345 ||  || — || September 2, 2008 || Kitt Peak || Spacewatch || — || align=right data-sort-value="0.93" | 930 m || 
|-id=346 bgcolor=#fefefe
| 446346 ||  || — || December 5, 2005 || Mount Lemmon || Mount Lemmon Survey || MAS || align=right data-sort-value="0.61" | 610 m || 
|-id=347 bgcolor=#d6d6d6
| 446347 ||  || — || February 11, 2008 || Mount Lemmon || Mount Lemmon Survey || — || align=right | 3.2 km || 
|-id=348 bgcolor=#E9E9E9
| 446348 ||  || — || May 19, 2010 || Catalina || CSS || EUN || align=right | 1.1 km || 
|-id=349 bgcolor=#fefefe
| 446349 ||  || — || February 16, 2010 || Kitt Peak || Spacewatch || MAS || align=right data-sort-value="0.58" | 580 m || 
|-id=350 bgcolor=#d6d6d6
| 446350 ||  || — || October 21, 2006 || Mount Lemmon || Mount Lemmon Survey || KOR || align=right | 1.1 km || 
|-id=351 bgcolor=#fefefe
| 446351 ||  || — || December 1, 2005 || Mount Lemmon || Mount Lemmon Survey || — || align=right data-sort-value="0.67" | 670 m || 
|-id=352 bgcolor=#fefefe
| 446352 ||  || — || February 10, 2010 || Kitt Peak || Spacewatch || NYS || align=right data-sort-value="0.52" | 520 m || 
|-id=353 bgcolor=#fefefe
| 446353 ||  || — || March 18, 2010 || Kitt Peak || Spacewatch || — || align=right | 1.1 km || 
|-id=354 bgcolor=#fefefe
| 446354 ||  || — || March 20, 2010 || Kitt Peak || Spacewatch || — || align=right | 1.0 km || 
|-id=355 bgcolor=#d6d6d6
| 446355 ||  || — || March 22, 2014 || Kitt Peak || Spacewatch || — || align=right | 2.3 km || 
|-id=356 bgcolor=#E9E9E9
| 446356 ||  || — || May 8, 2005 || Mount Lemmon || Mount Lemmon Survey || — || align=right | 2.0 km || 
|-id=357 bgcolor=#E9E9E9
| 446357 ||  || — || December 15, 2007 || Mount Lemmon || Mount Lemmon Survey || AGN || align=right | 1.2 km || 
|-id=358 bgcolor=#d6d6d6
| 446358 ||  || — || January 19, 2012 || Mount Lemmon || Mount Lemmon Survey || — || align=right | 2.9 km || 
|-id=359 bgcolor=#fefefe
| 446359 ||  || — || March 12, 2010 || Catalina || CSS || — || align=right | 1.1 km || 
|-id=360 bgcolor=#E9E9E9
| 446360 ||  || — || May 16, 2010 || Kitt Peak || Spacewatch || — || align=right data-sort-value="0.87" | 870 m || 
|-id=361 bgcolor=#fefefe
| 446361 ||  || — || July 2, 2011 || Mount Lemmon || Mount Lemmon Survey || — || align=right data-sort-value="0.88" | 880 m || 
|-id=362 bgcolor=#fefefe
| 446362 ||  || — || March 18, 2010 || Mount Lemmon || Mount Lemmon Survey || — || align=right data-sort-value="0.71" | 710 m || 
|-id=363 bgcolor=#fefefe
| 446363 ||  || — || October 27, 2008 || Kitt Peak || Spacewatch || — || align=right data-sort-value="0.71" | 710 m || 
|-id=364 bgcolor=#E9E9E9
| 446364 ||  || — || March 13, 2005 || Kitt Peak || Spacewatch || — || align=right | 2.2 km || 
|-id=365 bgcolor=#E9E9E9
| 446365 ||  || — || November 13, 2007 || Kitt Peak || Spacewatch || MIS || align=right | 2.9 km || 
|-id=366 bgcolor=#E9E9E9
| 446366 ||  || — || April 6, 2014 || Kitt Peak || Spacewatch || — || align=right | 1.4 km || 
|-id=367 bgcolor=#fefefe
| 446367 ||  || — || September 15, 2007 || Mount Lemmon || Mount Lemmon Survey || V || align=right data-sort-value="0.68" | 680 m || 
|-id=368 bgcolor=#fefefe
| 446368 ||  || — || April 20, 2007 || Kitt Peak || Spacewatch || V || align=right data-sort-value="0.74" | 740 m || 
|-id=369 bgcolor=#d6d6d6
| 446369 ||  || — || April 29, 2003 || Kitt Peak || Spacewatch || — || align=right | 2.8 km || 
|-id=370 bgcolor=#E9E9E9
| 446370 ||  || — || June 28, 2005 || Kitt Peak || Spacewatch || GEF || align=right | 1.1 km || 
|-id=371 bgcolor=#E9E9E9
| 446371 ||  || — || January 18, 2013 || Mount Lemmon || Mount Lemmon Survey || HOF || align=right | 2.3 km || 
|-id=372 bgcolor=#E9E9E9
| 446372 ||  || — || October 20, 2007 || Kitt Peak || Spacewatch || — || align=right | 1.4 km || 
|-id=373 bgcolor=#fefefe
| 446373 ||  || — || January 23, 2006 || Kitt Peak || Spacewatch || NYS || align=right data-sort-value="0.60" | 600 m || 
|-id=374 bgcolor=#fefefe
| 446374 ||  || — || October 10, 1996 || Kitt Peak || Spacewatch || — || align=right | 2.3 km || 
|-id=375 bgcolor=#E9E9E9
| 446375 ||  || — || October 8, 2007 || Mount Lemmon || Mount Lemmon Survey || — || align=right | 1.8 km || 
|-id=376 bgcolor=#E9E9E9
| 446376 ||  || — || May 21, 2006 || Mount Lemmon || Mount Lemmon Survey || — || align=right data-sort-value="0.94" | 940 m || 
|-id=377 bgcolor=#E9E9E9
| 446377 ||  || — || February 12, 2004 || Kitt Peak || Spacewatch || — || align=right | 2.3 km || 
|-id=378 bgcolor=#fefefe
| 446378 ||  || — || February 14, 2010 || Kitt Peak || Spacewatch || — || align=right | 1.1 km || 
|-id=379 bgcolor=#fefefe
| 446379 ||  || — || January 18, 2008 || Kitt Peak || Spacewatch || H || align=right data-sort-value="0.70" | 700 m || 
|-id=380 bgcolor=#E9E9E9
| 446380 ||  || — || January 28, 2009 || Kitt Peak || Spacewatch || — || align=right | 2.2 km || 
|-id=381 bgcolor=#E9E9E9
| 446381 ||  || — || December 21, 2008 || Catalina || CSS || — || align=right | 1.0 km || 
|-id=382 bgcolor=#fefefe
| 446382 ||  || — || October 28, 2008 || Kitt Peak || Spacewatch || NYS || align=right data-sort-value="0.68" | 680 m || 
|-id=383 bgcolor=#E9E9E9
| 446383 ||  || — || March 8, 2005 || Mount Lemmon || Mount Lemmon Survey || — || align=right | 1.1 km || 
|-id=384 bgcolor=#fefefe
| 446384 ||  || — || September 24, 2000 || Socorro || LINEAR || — || align=right data-sort-value="0.97" | 970 m || 
|-id=385 bgcolor=#d6d6d6
| 446385 ||  || — || October 19, 2006 || Kitt Peak || Spacewatch || KOR || align=right | 1.2 km || 
|-id=386 bgcolor=#d6d6d6
| 446386 ||  || — || July 10, 2010 || WISE || WISE || — || align=right | 2.4 km || 
|-id=387 bgcolor=#d6d6d6
| 446387 ||  || — || March 27, 2008 || Mount Lemmon || Mount Lemmon Survey || — || align=right | 2.4 km || 
|-id=388 bgcolor=#fefefe
| 446388 ||  || — || February 15, 2010 || Kitt Peak || Spacewatch || — || align=right data-sort-value="0.74" | 740 m || 
|-id=389 bgcolor=#E9E9E9
| 446389 ||  || — || September 18, 2003 || Kitt Peak || Spacewatch || — || align=right data-sort-value="0.90" | 900 m || 
|-id=390 bgcolor=#d6d6d6
| 446390 ||  || — || November 17, 2011 || Kitt Peak || Spacewatch || — || align=right | 2.7 km || 
|-id=391 bgcolor=#E9E9E9
| 446391 ||  || — || March 1, 2005 || Kitt Peak || Spacewatch || — || align=right | 1.8 km || 
|-id=392 bgcolor=#E9E9E9
| 446392 ||  || — || February 2, 2001 || Kitt Peak || Spacewatch || — || align=right | 1.1 km || 
|-id=393 bgcolor=#fefefe
| 446393 ||  || — || March 24, 2003 || Kitt Peak || Spacewatch || — || align=right data-sort-value="0.77" | 770 m || 
|-id=394 bgcolor=#E9E9E9
| 446394 ||  || — || June 10, 2010 || Mount Lemmon || Mount Lemmon Survey || — || align=right | 2.3 km || 
|-id=395 bgcolor=#E9E9E9
| 446395 ||  || — || October 23, 2006 || Mount Lemmon || Mount Lemmon Survey ||  || align=right | 2.5 km || 
|-id=396 bgcolor=#E9E9E9
| 446396 ||  || — || November 7, 2007 || Kitt Peak || Spacewatch || — || align=right | 1.1 km || 
|-id=397 bgcolor=#fefefe
| 446397 ||  || — || February 16, 2010 || Mount Lemmon || Mount Lemmon Survey || — || align=right data-sort-value="0.80" | 800 m || 
|-id=398 bgcolor=#E9E9E9
| 446398 ||  || — || November 30, 2011 || Kitt Peak || Spacewatch || — || align=right | 2.6 km || 
|-id=399 bgcolor=#fefefe
| 446399 ||  || — || November 23, 1997 || Kitt Peak || Spacewatch || — || align=right | 1.1 km || 
|-id=400 bgcolor=#E9E9E9
| 446400 ||  || — || September 30, 2011 || Kitt Peak || Spacewatch || — || align=right | 1.5 km || 
|}

446401–446500 

|-bgcolor=#fefefe
| 446401 ||  || — || October 6, 2004 || Kitt Peak || Spacewatch || — || align=right data-sort-value="0.92" | 920 m || 
|-id=402 bgcolor=#d6d6d6
| 446402 ||  || — || October 9, 2010 || Mount Lemmon || Mount Lemmon Survey || — || align=right | 2.0 km || 
|-id=403 bgcolor=#E9E9E9
| 446403 ||  || — || November 18, 2007 || Kitt Peak || Spacewatch || — || align=right | 2.1 km || 
|-id=404 bgcolor=#fefefe
| 446404 ||  || — || April 25, 2003 || Kitt Peak || Spacewatch || — || align=right | 1.6 km || 
|-id=405 bgcolor=#E9E9E9
| 446405 ||  || — || March 3, 2005 || Catalina || CSS || — || align=right | 3.0 km || 
|-id=406 bgcolor=#E9E9E9
| 446406 ||  || — || September 11, 2007 || Mount Lemmon || Mount Lemmon Survey || — || align=right | 2.8 km || 
|-id=407 bgcolor=#E9E9E9
| 446407 ||  || — || May 18, 2005 || Siding Spring || SSS || — || align=right | 3.1 km || 
|-id=408 bgcolor=#d6d6d6
| 446408 ||  || — || February 8, 2002 || Kitt Peak || Spacewatch || HYG || align=right | 2.7 km || 
|-id=409 bgcolor=#fefefe
| 446409 ||  || — || October 26, 2008 || Mount Lemmon || Mount Lemmon Survey || — || align=right data-sort-value="0.75" | 750 m || 
|-id=410 bgcolor=#fefefe
| 446410 ||  || — || January 22, 2006 || Mount Lemmon || Mount Lemmon Survey || — || align=right data-sort-value="0.79" | 790 m || 
|-id=411 bgcolor=#E9E9E9
| 446411 ||  || — || November 2, 2011 || Kitt Peak || Spacewatch || — || align=right | 1.8 km || 
|-id=412 bgcolor=#E9E9E9
| 446412 ||  || — || February 28, 2009 || Kitt Peak || Spacewatch || WIT || align=right data-sort-value="0.96" | 960 m || 
|-id=413 bgcolor=#d6d6d6
| 446413 ||  || — || August 11, 2009 || Siding Spring || SSS || — || align=right | 3.6 km || 
|-id=414 bgcolor=#E9E9E9
| 446414 ||  || — || October 6, 1999 || Kitt Peak || Spacewatch || — || align=right | 1.2 km || 
|-id=415 bgcolor=#d6d6d6
| 446415 ||  || — || February 12, 2008 || Kitt Peak || Spacewatch || — || align=right | 2.0 km || 
|-id=416 bgcolor=#fefefe
| 446416 ||  || — || February 15, 2010 || Kitt Peak || Spacewatch || — || align=right data-sort-value="0.90" | 900 m || 
|-id=417 bgcolor=#d6d6d6
| 446417 ||  || — || January 30, 2008 || Mount Lemmon || Mount Lemmon Survey || — || align=right | 2.1 km || 
|-id=418 bgcolor=#E9E9E9
| 446418 ||  || — || November 8, 2007 || Kitt Peak || Spacewatch || — || align=right | 2.0 km || 
|-id=419 bgcolor=#d6d6d6
| 446419 ||  || — || March 1, 2008 || Kitt Peak || Spacewatch || — || align=right | 2.8 km || 
|-id=420 bgcolor=#fefefe
| 446420 ||  || — || November 4, 2005 || Kitt Peak || Spacewatch || — || align=right data-sort-value="0.62" | 620 m || 
|-id=421 bgcolor=#d6d6d6
| 446421 ||  || — || March 1, 2008 || Kitt Peak || Spacewatch || — || align=right | 2.1 km || 
|-id=422 bgcolor=#fefefe
| 446422 ||  || — || December 21, 2012 || Mount Lemmon || Mount Lemmon Survey || — || align=right | 1.1 km || 
|-id=423 bgcolor=#E9E9E9
| 446423 ||  || — || March 11, 2005 || Mount Lemmon || Mount Lemmon Survey || — || align=right | 1.2 km || 
|-id=424 bgcolor=#E9E9E9
| 446424 ||  || — || March 11, 2005 || Mount Lemmon || Mount Lemmon Survey || — || align=right | 1.9 km || 
|-id=425 bgcolor=#E9E9E9
| 446425 ||  || — || July 4, 2010 || Mount Lemmon || Mount Lemmon Survey || — || align=right | 1.8 km || 
|-id=426 bgcolor=#d6d6d6
| 446426 ||  || — || May 5, 2014 || Mount Lemmon || Mount Lemmon Survey || — || align=right | 2.3 km || 
|-id=427 bgcolor=#d6d6d6
| 446427 ||  || — || February 9, 2008 || Kitt Peak || Spacewatch || — || align=right | 2.0 km || 
|-id=428 bgcolor=#E9E9E9
| 446428 ||  || — || April 11, 2005 || Mount Lemmon || Mount Lemmon Survey || — || align=right | 1.8 km || 
|-id=429 bgcolor=#d6d6d6
| 446429 ||  || — || October 1, 2006 || Kitt Peak || Spacewatch || — || align=right | 3.8 km || 
|-id=430 bgcolor=#fefefe
| 446430 ||  || — || March 24, 2006 || Kitt Peak || Spacewatch || — || align=right | 1.0 km || 
|-id=431 bgcolor=#E9E9E9
| 446431 ||  || — || February 22, 2009 || Kitt Peak || Spacewatch || — || align=right | 1.5 km || 
|-id=432 bgcolor=#fefefe
| 446432 ||  || — || March 27, 2004 || Catalina || CSS || — || align=right data-sort-value="0.81" | 810 m || 
|-id=433 bgcolor=#d6d6d6
| 446433 ||  || — || November 15, 2011 || Mount Lemmon || Mount Lemmon Survey || — || align=right | 2.3 km || 
|-id=434 bgcolor=#E9E9E9
| 446434 ||  || — || January 20, 2009 || Mount Lemmon || Mount Lemmon Survey || — || align=right | 1.1 km || 
|-id=435 bgcolor=#E9E9E9
| 446435 ||  || — || August 19, 2006 || Kitt Peak || Spacewatch || — || align=right | 1.4 km || 
|-id=436 bgcolor=#d6d6d6
| 446436 ||  || — || February 1, 2003 || Kitt Peak || Spacewatch || — || align=right | 2.5 km || 
|-id=437 bgcolor=#d6d6d6
| 446437 ||  || — || January 20, 2008 || Kitt Peak || Spacewatch || — || align=right | 2.8 km || 
|-id=438 bgcolor=#d6d6d6
| 446438 ||  || — || May 25, 2003 || Kitt Peak || Spacewatch || — || align=right | 3.1 km || 
|-id=439 bgcolor=#E9E9E9
| 446439 ||  || — || March 1, 2009 || Kitt Peak || Spacewatch || — || align=right | 2.1 km || 
|-id=440 bgcolor=#E9E9E9
| 446440 ||  || — || February 28, 2010 || WISE || WISE || — || align=right | 2.3 km || 
|-id=441 bgcolor=#d6d6d6
| 446441 ||  || — || January 5, 2013 || Kitt Peak || Spacewatch || KOR || align=right | 1.2 km || 
|-id=442 bgcolor=#fefefe
| 446442 ||  || — || May 14, 2004 || Kitt Peak || Spacewatch || — || align=right data-sort-value="0.77" | 770 m || 
|-id=443 bgcolor=#E9E9E9
| 446443 ||  || — || December 30, 2008 || Kitt Peak || Spacewatch || — || align=right data-sort-value="0.87" | 870 m || 
|-id=444 bgcolor=#E9E9E9
| 446444 ||  || — || February 14, 2013 || Kitt Peak || Spacewatch || — || align=right | 2.5 km || 
|-id=445 bgcolor=#E9E9E9
| 446445 ||  || — || May 20, 2010 || Mount Lemmon || Mount Lemmon Survey || — || align=right | 2.8 km || 
|-id=446 bgcolor=#d6d6d6
| 446446 ||  || — || May 7, 2010 || WISE || WISE || — || align=right | 3.1 km || 
|-id=447 bgcolor=#E9E9E9
| 446447 ||  || — || May 17, 2010 || Kitt Peak || Spacewatch || MAR || align=right data-sort-value="0.98" | 980 m || 
|-id=448 bgcolor=#fefefe
| 446448 ||  || — || May 10, 2007 || Mount Lemmon || Mount Lemmon Survey || — || align=right data-sort-value="0.63" | 630 m || 
|-id=449 bgcolor=#d6d6d6
| 446449 ||  || — || January 2, 2012 || Mount Lemmon || Mount Lemmon Survey || — || align=right | 2.9 km || 
|-id=450 bgcolor=#E9E9E9
| 446450 ||  || — || March 1, 2009 || Kitt Peak || Spacewatch || — || align=right | 1.9 km || 
|-id=451 bgcolor=#d6d6d6
| 446451 ||  || — || June 23, 2009 || Mount Lemmon || Mount Lemmon Survey || — || align=right | 2.7 km || 
|-id=452 bgcolor=#E9E9E9
| 446452 ||  || — || January 19, 2005 || Kitt Peak || Spacewatch || — || align=right | 1.2 km || 
|-id=453 bgcolor=#fefefe
| 446453 ||  || — || March 27, 2003 || Anderson Mesa || LONEOS || MAS || align=right data-sort-value="0.73" | 730 m || 
|-id=454 bgcolor=#fefefe
| 446454 ||  || — || December 12, 2012 || Kitt Peak || Spacewatch || — || align=right | 1.1 km || 
|-id=455 bgcolor=#fefefe
| 446455 ||  || — || December 25, 2005 || Kitt Peak || Spacewatch || — || align=right data-sort-value="0.84" | 840 m || 
|-id=456 bgcolor=#E9E9E9
| 446456 ||  || — || September 12, 2007 || Mount Lemmon || Mount Lemmon Survey || — || align=right | 1.8 km || 
|-id=457 bgcolor=#E9E9E9
| 446457 ||  || — || December 31, 2008 || Kitt Peak || Spacewatch || — || align=right data-sort-value="0.76" | 760 m || 
|-id=458 bgcolor=#E9E9E9
| 446458 ||  || — || December 4, 2007 || Kitt Peak || Spacewatch || — || align=right | 2.7 km || 
|-id=459 bgcolor=#E9E9E9
| 446459 ||  || — || March 3, 2009 || Mount Lemmon || Mount Lemmon Survey || — || align=right | 2.1 km || 
|-id=460 bgcolor=#E9E9E9
| 446460 ||  || — || October 21, 2011 || Mount Lemmon || Mount Lemmon Survey || EUN || align=right | 1.2 km || 
|-id=461 bgcolor=#E9E9E9
| 446461 ||  || — || May 24, 2000 || Kitt Peak || Spacewatch || — || align=right | 1.9 km || 
|-id=462 bgcolor=#d6d6d6
| 446462 ||  || — || February 2, 2008 || Kitt Peak || Spacewatch || — || align=right | 2.2 km || 
|-id=463 bgcolor=#fefefe
| 446463 ||  || — || September 19, 2011 || Mount Lemmon || Mount Lemmon Survey || — || align=right | 1.1 km || 
|-id=464 bgcolor=#E9E9E9
| 446464 ||  || — || October 19, 2006 || Kitt Peak || Spacewatch || — || align=right | 2.5 km || 
|-id=465 bgcolor=#E9E9E9
| 446465 ||  || — || September 17, 2006 || Kitt Peak || Spacewatch || — || align=right | 1.9 km || 
|-id=466 bgcolor=#E9E9E9
| 446466 ||  || — || April 18, 2009 || Kitt Peak || Spacewatch || AST || align=right | 1.6 km || 
|-id=467 bgcolor=#E9E9E9
| 446467 ||  || — || January 31, 1997 || Kitt Peak || Spacewatch || — || align=right data-sort-value="0.89" | 890 m || 
|-id=468 bgcolor=#fefefe
| 446468 ||  || — || June 15, 2007 || Kitt Peak || Spacewatch || — || align=right data-sort-value="0.94" | 940 m || 
|-id=469 bgcolor=#E9E9E9
| 446469 ||  || — || April 22, 2010 || WISE || WISE || — || align=right | 3.4 km || 
|-id=470 bgcolor=#E9E9E9
| 446470 ||  || — || September 30, 2006 || Kitt Peak || Spacewatch || — || align=right | 3.2 km || 
|-id=471 bgcolor=#fefefe
| 446471 ||  || — || May 17, 2007 || Catalina || CSS || — || align=right data-sort-value="0.79" | 790 m || 
|-id=472 bgcolor=#fefefe
| 446472 ||  || — || January 7, 2010 || Mount Lemmon || Mount Lemmon Survey || — || align=right data-sort-value="0.83" | 830 m || 
|-id=473 bgcolor=#E9E9E9
| 446473 ||  || — || November 13, 2007 || Mount Lemmon || Mount Lemmon Survey || — || align=right | 1.2 km || 
|-id=474 bgcolor=#E9E9E9
| 446474 ||  || — || September 16, 2006 || Siding Spring || SSS || — || align=right | 3.4 km || 
|-id=475 bgcolor=#fefefe
| 446475 ||  || — || November 19, 2008 || Kitt Peak || Spacewatch || V || align=right data-sort-value="0.70" | 700 m || 
|-id=476 bgcolor=#E9E9E9
| 446476 ||  || — || January 24, 2001 || Kitt Peak || Spacewatch || — || align=right | 1.1 km || 
|-id=477 bgcolor=#fefefe
| 446477 ||  || — || March 25, 2010 || Kitt Peak || Spacewatch || — || align=right data-sort-value="0.84" | 840 m || 
|-id=478 bgcolor=#E9E9E9
| 446478 ||  || — || September 17, 2006 || Catalina || CSS || — || align=right | 2.1 km || 
|-id=479 bgcolor=#E9E9E9
| 446479 ||  || — || November 3, 2007 || Kitt Peak || Spacewatch || — || align=right | 1.9 km || 
|-id=480 bgcolor=#d6d6d6
| 446480 ||  || — || July 28, 2010 || WISE || WISE || — || align=right | 2.1 km || 
|-id=481 bgcolor=#E9E9E9
| 446481 ||  || — || April 21, 2010 || WISE || WISE || — || align=right | 2.2 km || 
|-id=482 bgcolor=#E9E9E9
| 446482 ||  || — || April 21, 2014 || Kitt Peak || Spacewatch || — || align=right | 1.6 km || 
|-id=483 bgcolor=#fefefe
| 446483 ||  || — || November 7, 2008 || Mount Lemmon || Mount Lemmon Survey || — || align=right data-sort-value="0.89" | 890 m || 
|-id=484 bgcolor=#E9E9E9
| 446484 ||  || — || November 17, 2007 || Mount Lemmon || Mount Lemmon Survey || — || align=right | 1.3 km || 
|-id=485 bgcolor=#fefefe
| 446485 ||  || — || April 16, 2007 || Mount Lemmon || Mount Lemmon Survey || — || align=right data-sort-value="0.77" | 770 m || 
|-id=486 bgcolor=#fefefe
| 446486 ||  || — || February 27, 2006 || Kitt Peak || Spacewatch || — || align=right data-sort-value="0.84" | 840 m || 
|-id=487 bgcolor=#E9E9E9
| 446487 ||  || — || June 19, 2006 || Mount Lemmon || Mount Lemmon Survey || — || align=right | 2.6 km || 
|-id=488 bgcolor=#E9E9E9
| 446488 ||  || — || January 17, 2009 || Kitt Peak || Spacewatch || — || align=right | 1.9 km || 
|-id=489 bgcolor=#d6d6d6
| 446489 ||  || — || January 4, 2012 || Mount Lemmon || Mount Lemmon Survey || — || align=right | 3.1 km || 
|-id=490 bgcolor=#d6d6d6
| 446490 ||  || — || August 21, 2004 || Catalina || CSS || — || align=right | 2.7 km || 
|-id=491 bgcolor=#E9E9E9
| 446491 ||  || — || November 1, 1999 || Kitt Peak || Spacewatch || — || align=right | 1.2 km || 
|-id=492 bgcolor=#d6d6d6
| 446492 ||  || — || February 8, 2002 || Kitt Peak || Spacewatch || — || align=right | 2.3 km || 
|-id=493 bgcolor=#d6d6d6
| 446493 ||  || — || September 20, 1998 || Kitt Peak || Spacewatch || — || align=right | 2.9 km || 
|-id=494 bgcolor=#fefefe
| 446494 ||  || — || April 9, 2010 || Kitt Peak || Spacewatch || — || align=right data-sort-value="0.97" | 970 m || 
|-id=495 bgcolor=#d6d6d6
| 446495 ||  || — || October 10, 2010 || Mount Lemmon || Mount Lemmon Survey || — || align=right | 2.7 km || 
|-id=496 bgcolor=#d6d6d6
| 446496 ||  || — || June 15, 1999 || Kitt Peak || Spacewatch || — || align=right | 2.4 km || 
|-id=497 bgcolor=#d6d6d6
| 446497 ||  || — || January 24, 2007 || Mount Lemmon || Mount Lemmon Survey || EOS || align=right | 1.7 km || 
|-id=498 bgcolor=#d6d6d6
| 446498 ||  || — || September 17, 2010 || Mount Lemmon || Mount Lemmon Survey || EOS || align=right | 1.9 km || 
|-id=499 bgcolor=#d6d6d6
| 446499 ||  || — || April 7, 2008 || Kitt Peak || Spacewatch || VER || align=right | 2.4 km || 
|-id=500 bgcolor=#d6d6d6
| 446500 Katrinraynor ||  ||  || November 5, 2010 || Mount Lemmon || Mount Lemmon Survey || — || align=right | 3.3 km || 
|}

446501–446600 

|-bgcolor=#fefefe
| 446501 ||  || — || May 21, 2006 || Kitt Peak || Spacewatch || — || align=right data-sort-value="0.94" | 940 m || 
|-id=502 bgcolor=#E9E9E9
| 446502 ||  || — || March 1, 2009 || Mount Lemmon || Mount Lemmon Survey || — || align=right | 1.7 km || 
|-id=503 bgcolor=#E9E9E9
| 446503 ||  || — || April 15, 2001 || Kitt Peak || Spacewatch || — || align=right | 1.3 km || 
|-id=504 bgcolor=#E9E9E9
| 446504 ||  || — || August 30, 2006 || Anderson Mesa || LONEOS || — || align=right | 1.6 km || 
|-id=505 bgcolor=#fefefe
| 446505 ||  || — || January 30, 2006 || Kitt Peak || Spacewatch || — || align=right data-sort-value="0.75" | 750 m || 
|-id=506 bgcolor=#E9E9E9
| 446506 ||  || — || November 4, 2007 || Mount Lemmon || Mount Lemmon Survey || — || align=right data-sort-value="0.95" | 950 m || 
|-id=507 bgcolor=#E9E9E9
| 446507 ||  || — || March 4, 2005 || Mount Lemmon || Mount Lemmon Survey || — || align=right | 1.2 km || 
|-id=508 bgcolor=#E9E9E9
| 446508 ||  || — || January 31, 2009 || Mount Lemmon || Mount Lemmon Survey || — || align=right data-sort-value="0.95" | 950 m || 
|-id=509 bgcolor=#d6d6d6
| 446509 ||  || — || September 25, 2005 || Kitt Peak || Spacewatch || EMA || align=right | 3.0 km || 
|-id=510 bgcolor=#d6d6d6
| 446510 ||  || — || February 17, 2007 || Kitt Peak || Spacewatch || — || align=right | 2.8 km || 
|-id=511 bgcolor=#fefefe
| 446511 ||  || — || April 26, 2003 || Kitt Peak || Spacewatch || — || align=right data-sort-value="0.70" | 700 m || 
|-id=512 bgcolor=#d6d6d6
| 446512 ||  || — || November 14, 1995 || Kitt Peak || Spacewatch || EOS || align=right | 1.9 km || 
|-id=513 bgcolor=#E9E9E9
| 446513 ||  || — || September 23, 2011 || Catalina || CSS || — || align=right | 1.1 km || 
|-id=514 bgcolor=#fefefe
| 446514 ||  || — || May 24, 2007 || Mount Lemmon || Mount Lemmon Survey || — || align=right data-sort-value="0.65" | 650 m || 
|-id=515 bgcolor=#E9E9E9
| 446515 ||  || — || November 30, 2008 || Kitt Peak || Spacewatch || — || align=right | 1.1 km || 
|-id=516 bgcolor=#d6d6d6
| 446516 ||  || — || October 25, 2005 || Mount Lemmon || Mount Lemmon Survey || — || align=right | 2.2 km || 
|-id=517 bgcolor=#fefefe
| 446517 ||  || — || September 24, 2008 || Mount Lemmon || Mount Lemmon Survey || — || align=right data-sort-value="0.84" | 840 m || 
|-id=518 bgcolor=#E9E9E9
| 446518 ||  || — || December 30, 2008 || Mount Lemmon || Mount Lemmon Survey || — || align=right | 1.5 km || 
|-id=519 bgcolor=#E9E9E9
| 446519 ||  || — || September 17, 2006 || Anderson Mesa || LONEOS || — || align=right | 2.2 km || 
|-id=520 bgcolor=#E9E9E9
| 446520 ||  || — || November 2, 2007 || Kitt Peak || Spacewatch || — || align=right | 1.6 km || 
|-id=521 bgcolor=#d6d6d6
| 446521 ||  || — || October 29, 2011 || Kitt Peak || Spacewatch || — || align=right | 2.9 km || 
|-id=522 bgcolor=#E9E9E9
| 446522 ||  || — || October 18, 2007 || Kitt Peak || Spacewatch || — || align=right | 1.5 km || 
|-id=523 bgcolor=#d6d6d6
| 446523 ||  || — || March 5, 2002 || Kitt Peak || Spacewatch || THM || align=right | 2.4 km || 
|-id=524 bgcolor=#d6d6d6
| 446524 ||  || — || December 13, 2006 || Kitt Peak || Spacewatch || — || align=right | 3.1 km || 
|-id=525 bgcolor=#d6d6d6
| 446525 ||  || — || April 15, 2008 || Mount Lemmon || Mount Lemmon Survey || — || align=right | 4.0 km || 
|-id=526 bgcolor=#E9E9E9
| 446526 ||  || — || November 17, 1999 || Kitt Peak || Spacewatch || — || align=right | 1.3 km || 
|-id=527 bgcolor=#fefefe
| 446527 ||  || — || January 23, 2006 || Kitt Peak || Spacewatch || MAS || align=right data-sort-value="0.74" | 740 m || 
|-id=528 bgcolor=#E9E9E9
| 446528 ||  || — || September 26, 2006 || Mount Lemmon || Mount Lemmon Survey || — || align=right | 2.0 km || 
|-id=529 bgcolor=#E9E9E9
| 446529 ||  || — || March 14, 2004 || Kitt Peak || Spacewatch || — || align=right | 2.7 km || 
|-id=530 bgcolor=#fefefe
| 446530 ||  || — || November 10, 2005 || Mount Lemmon || Mount Lemmon Survey || V || align=right data-sort-value="0.78" | 780 m || 
|-id=531 bgcolor=#d6d6d6
| 446531 ||  || — || October 9, 2004 || Kitt Peak || Spacewatch || — || align=right | 2.9 km || 
|-id=532 bgcolor=#E9E9E9
| 446532 ||  || — || April 20, 2009 || Kitt Peak || Spacewatch || — || align=right | 1.9 km || 
|-id=533 bgcolor=#d6d6d6
| 446533 ||  || — || April 4, 2008 || Mount Lemmon || Mount Lemmon Survey || — || align=right | 3.6 km || 
|-id=534 bgcolor=#d6d6d6
| 446534 ||  || — || February 6, 2013 || Kitt Peak || Spacewatch || — || align=right | 3.5 km || 
|-id=535 bgcolor=#E9E9E9
| 446535 ||  || — || August 15, 2006 || Siding Spring || SSS || — || align=right | 1.9 km || 
|-id=536 bgcolor=#d6d6d6
| 446536 ||  || — || August 28, 2009 || Catalina || CSS || — || align=right | 3.7 km || 
|-id=537 bgcolor=#fefefe
| 446537 ||  || — || April 9, 2010 || Mount Lemmon || Mount Lemmon Survey || — || align=right data-sort-value="0.85" | 850 m || 
|-id=538 bgcolor=#E9E9E9
| 446538 ||  || — || May 13, 1997 || Kitt Peak || Spacewatch || — || align=right | 1.7 km || 
|-id=539 bgcolor=#fefefe
| 446539 ||  || — || September 23, 2008 || Kitt Peak || Spacewatch || V || align=right data-sort-value="0.73" | 730 m || 
|-id=540 bgcolor=#E9E9E9
| 446540 ||  || — || March 1, 2005 || Kitt Peak || Spacewatch || — || align=right | 2.0 km || 
|-id=541 bgcolor=#E9E9E9
| 446541 ||  || — || March 7, 2013 || Mount Lemmon || Mount Lemmon Survey || — || align=right | 2.3 km || 
|-id=542 bgcolor=#E9E9E9
| 446542 ||  || — || April 1, 2009 || Mount Lemmon || Mount Lemmon Survey || — || align=right | 2.7 km || 
|-id=543 bgcolor=#d6d6d6
| 446543 ||  || — || October 25, 2005 || Kitt Peak || Spacewatch || — || align=right | 2.7 km || 
|-id=544 bgcolor=#d6d6d6
| 446544 ||  || — || September 10, 2010 || Kitt Peak || Spacewatch || — || align=right | 3.4 km || 
|-id=545 bgcolor=#E9E9E9
| 446545 ||  || — || March 31, 2009 || Kitt Peak || Spacewatch || — || align=right | 1.9 km || 
|-id=546 bgcolor=#E9E9E9
| 446546 ||  || — || September 27, 2006 || Catalina || CSS || — || align=right | 2.8 km || 
|-id=547 bgcolor=#d6d6d6
| 446547 ||  || — || May 3, 2008 || Mount Lemmon || Mount Lemmon Survey || — || align=right | 2.4 km || 
|-id=548 bgcolor=#E9E9E9
| 446548 ||  || — || October 22, 2006 || Kitt Peak || Spacewatch || HOF || align=right | 3.3 km || 
|-id=549 bgcolor=#fefefe
| 446549 ||  || — || November 6, 2005 || Kitt Peak || Spacewatch || — || align=right data-sort-value="0.74" | 740 m || 
|-id=550 bgcolor=#E9E9E9
| 446550 ||  || — || July 7, 2010 || Kitt Peak || Spacewatch || — || align=right | 2.1 km || 
|-id=551 bgcolor=#d6d6d6
| 446551 ||  || — || January 23, 2006 || Mount Lemmon || Mount Lemmon Survey || — || align=right | 2.7 km || 
|-id=552 bgcolor=#d6d6d6
| 446552 ||  || — || May 5, 2008 || Mount Lemmon || Mount Lemmon Survey || — || align=right | 2.7 km || 
|-id=553 bgcolor=#E9E9E9
| 446553 ||  || — || October 21, 2006 || Kitt Peak || Spacewatch || WIT || align=right data-sort-value="0.88" | 880 m || 
|-id=554 bgcolor=#d6d6d6
| 446554 ||  || — || August 15, 2009 || Kitt Peak || Spacewatch || — || align=right | 2.9 km || 
|-id=555 bgcolor=#E9E9E9
| 446555 ||  || — || March 16, 2004 || Siding Spring || SSS || — || align=right | 3.4 km || 
|-id=556 bgcolor=#E9E9E9
| 446556 ||  || — || March 22, 2001 || Kitt Peak || Spacewatch || EUN || align=right | 1.5 km || 
|-id=557 bgcolor=#d6d6d6
| 446557 ||  || — || December 14, 2010 || Mount Lemmon || Mount Lemmon Survey || — || align=right | 3.2 km || 
|-id=558 bgcolor=#d6d6d6
| 446558 ||  || — || February 12, 2012 || Mount Lemmon || Mount Lemmon Survey || — || align=right | 3.1 km || 
|-id=559 bgcolor=#d6d6d6
| 446559 ||  || — || January 21, 2001 || Kitt Peak || Spacewatch || — || align=right | 4.1 km || 
|-id=560 bgcolor=#E9E9E9
| 446560 ||  || — || August 30, 2005 || Kitt Peak || Spacewatch || AGN || align=right | 1.2 km || 
|-id=561 bgcolor=#d6d6d6
| 446561 ||  || — || December 25, 2005 || Kitt Peak || Spacewatch || — || align=right | 2.9 km || 
|-id=562 bgcolor=#d6d6d6
| 446562 ||  || — || September 19, 1995 || Kitt Peak || Spacewatch || KOR || align=right | 1.2 km || 
|-id=563 bgcolor=#d6d6d6
| 446563 ||  || — || January 7, 2006 || Kitt Peak || Spacewatch || — || align=right | 2.7 km || 
|-id=564 bgcolor=#d6d6d6
| 446564 ||  || — || December 25, 2011 || Mount Lemmon || Mount Lemmon Survey || — || align=right | 3.3 km || 
|-id=565 bgcolor=#d6d6d6
| 446565 ||  || — || December 7, 2005 || Kitt Peak || Spacewatch || — || align=right | 3.1 km || 
|-id=566 bgcolor=#E9E9E9
| 446566 ||  || — || October 10, 2001 || Kitt Peak || Spacewatch || — || align=right | 2.6 km || 
|-id=567 bgcolor=#d6d6d6
| 446567 ||  || — || February 2, 2012 || Kitt Peak || Spacewatch || — || align=right | 3.0 km || 
|-id=568 bgcolor=#E9E9E9
| 446568 ||  || — || February 15, 1994 || Kitt Peak || Spacewatch || — || align=right | 2.7 km || 
|-id=569 bgcolor=#E9E9E9
| 446569 ||  || — || December 26, 2011 || Kitt Peak || Spacewatch || — || align=right | 3.0 km || 
|-id=570 bgcolor=#d6d6d6
| 446570 ||  || — || November 10, 2009 || Kitt Peak || Spacewatch || 7:4 || align=right | 3.7 km || 
|-id=571 bgcolor=#E9E9E9
| 446571 ||  || — || February 2, 2008 || Mount Lemmon || Mount Lemmon Survey || — || align=right | 1.8 km || 
|-id=572 bgcolor=#d6d6d6
| 446572 ||  || — || September 12, 2007 || Mount Lemmon || Mount Lemmon Survey || 3:2 || align=right | 4.8 km || 
|-id=573 bgcolor=#d6d6d6
| 446573 ||  || — || June 23, 2009 || Mount Lemmon || Mount Lemmon Survey || — || align=right | 3.0 km || 
|-id=574 bgcolor=#d6d6d6
| 446574 ||  || — || September 18, 2004 || Socorro || LINEAR || EOS || align=right | 1.8 km || 
|-id=575 bgcolor=#d6d6d6
| 446575 ||  || — || November 11, 1999 || Kitt Peak || Spacewatch || — || align=right | 2.3 km || 
|-id=576 bgcolor=#d6d6d6
| 446576 ||  || — || January 30, 2006 || Kitt Peak || Spacewatch || — || align=right | 3.3 km || 
|-id=577 bgcolor=#d6d6d6
| 446577 ||  || — || December 5, 2005 || Kitt Peak || Spacewatch || EOS || align=right | 2.4 km || 
|-id=578 bgcolor=#E9E9E9
| 446578 ||  || — || September 16, 2010 || Kitt Peak || Spacewatch || HOF || align=right | 2.6 km || 
|-id=579 bgcolor=#d6d6d6
| 446579 ||  || — || April 11, 2008 || Mount Lemmon || Mount Lemmon Survey || — || align=right | 2.9 km || 
|-id=580 bgcolor=#d6d6d6
| 446580 ||  || — || January 5, 2002 || Kitt Peak || Spacewatch || — || align=right | 3.0 km || 
|-id=581 bgcolor=#d6d6d6
| 446581 ||  || — || January 25, 2010 || WISE || WISE || 7:4 || align=right | 3.8 km || 
|-id=582 bgcolor=#d6d6d6
| 446582 ||  || — || October 29, 2010 || Mount Lemmon || Mount Lemmon Survey || — || align=right | 3.2 km || 
|-id=583 bgcolor=#d6d6d6
| 446583 ||  || — || December 7, 2010 || Mount Lemmon || Mount Lemmon Survey || EOS || align=right | 2.0 km || 
|-id=584 bgcolor=#d6d6d6
| 446584 ||  || — || February 10, 2010 || Kitt Peak || Spacewatch || 3:2 || align=right | 5.1 km || 
|-id=585 bgcolor=#E9E9E9
| 446585 ||  || — || March 2, 2005 || Kitt Peak || Spacewatch || — || align=right | 1.1 km || 
|-id=586 bgcolor=#d6d6d6
| 446586 ||  || — || February 20, 2006 || Mount Lemmon || Mount Lemmon Survey || — || align=right | 3.4 km || 
|-id=587 bgcolor=#d6d6d6
| 446587 ||  || — || September 6, 2008 || Kitt Peak || Spacewatch || ULA7:4 || align=right | 3.4 km || 
|-id=588 bgcolor=#d6d6d6
| 446588 ||  || — || June 28, 2013 || Mount Lemmon || Mount Lemmon Survey || — || align=right | 3.4 km || 
|-id=589 bgcolor=#d6d6d6
| 446589 ||  || — || February 26, 2007 || Mount Lemmon || Mount Lemmon Survey || EOS || align=right | 2.8 km || 
|-id=590 bgcolor=#d6d6d6
| 446590 ||  || — || July 29, 2008 || Mount Lemmon || Mount Lemmon Survey || — || align=right | 3.6 km || 
|-id=591 bgcolor=#d6d6d6
| 446591 ||  || — || May 11, 2007 || Mount Lemmon || Mount Lemmon Survey || VER || align=right | 3.7 km || 
|-id=592 bgcolor=#d6d6d6
| 446592 ||  || — || September 7, 2004 || Socorro || LINEAR || Tj (2.98) || align=right | 6.4 km || 
|-id=593 bgcolor=#E9E9E9
| 446593 ||  || — || April 5, 2010 || Kitt Peak || Spacewatch || — || align=right | 2.2 km || 
|-id=594 bgcolor=#E9E9E9
| 446594 ||  || — || November 19, 2007 || Kitt Peak || Spacewatch || — || align=right | 1.7 km || 
|-id=595 bgcolor=#d6d6d6
| 446595 ||  || — || May 22, 2010 || WISE || WISE || — || align=right | 3.3 km || 
|-id=596 bgcolor=#d6d6d6
| 446596 ||  || — || October 24, 1995 || Kitt Peak || Spacewatch || — || align=right | 3.1 km || 
|-id=597 bgcolor=#E9E9E9
| 446597 ||  || — || March 2, 2006 || Kitt Peak || Spacewatch || — || align=right | 1.5 km || 
|-id=598 bgcolor=#E9E9E9
| 446598 ||  || — || October 15, 2007 || Mount Lemmon || Mount Lemmon Survey || — || align=right | 1.6 km || 
|-id=599 bgcolor=#d6d6d6
| 446599 ||  || — || April 7, 2014 || Mount Lemmon || Mount Lemmon Survey || EOS || align=right | 1.4 km || 
|-id=600 bgcolor=#d6d6d6
| 446600 ||  || — || May 27, 2010 || WISE || WISE || — || align=right | 3.8 km || 
|}

446601–446700 

|-bgcolor=#d6d6d6
| 446601 ||  || — || June 28, 2010 || WISE || WISE || VER || align=right | 2.6 km || 
|-id=602 bgcolor=#d6d6d6
| 446602 ||  || — || September 4, 2010 || Mount Lemmon || Mount Lemmon Survey || — || align=right | 4.7 km || 
|-id=603 bgcolor=#fefefe
| 446603 ||  || — || August 23, 2008 || Kitt Peak || Spacewatch || NYS || align=right data-sort-value="0.60" | 600 m || 
|-id=604 bgcolor=#fefefe
| 446604 ||  || — || October 9, 2004 || Socorro || LINEAR || — || align=right data-sort-value="0.81" | 810 m || 
|-id=605 bgcolor=#E9E9E9
| 446605 ||  || — || October 9, 2007 || Kitt Peak || Spacewatch || — || align=right | 1.4 km || 
|-id=606 bgcolor=#d6d6d6
| 446606 ||  || — || November 30, 2005 || Mount Lemmon || Mount Lemmon Survey || — || align=right | 2.9 km || 
|-id=607 bgcolor=#E9E9E9
| 446607 ||  || — || October 1, 2011 || Mount Lemmon || Mount Lemmon Survey || — || align=right | 1.8 km || 
|-id=608 bgcolor=#E9E9E9
| 446608 ||  || — || December 14, 2004 || Campo Imperatore || CINEOS || — || align=right | 1.4 km || 
|-id=609 bgcolor=#d6d6d6
| 446609 ||  || — || October 27, 2005 || Kitt Peak || Spacewatch || — || align=right | 3.8 km || 
|-id=610 bgcolor=#fefefe
| 446610 ||  || — || February 28, 2008 || Kitt Peak || Spacewatch || — || align=right data-sort-value="0.76" | 760 m || 
|-id=611 bgcolor=#fefefe
| 446611 ||  || — || June 13, 2004 || Kitt Peak || Spacewatch || — || align=right data-sort-value="0.64" | 640 m || 
|-id=612 bgcolor=#d6d6d6
| 446612 ||  || — || January 9, 2007 || Mount Lemmon || Mount Lemmon Survey || — || align=right | 4.7 km || 
|-id=613 bgcolor=#d6d6d6
| 446613 ||  || — || March 6, 2008 || Mount Lemmon || Mount Lemmon Survey || EOS || align=right | 2.1 km || 
|-id=614 bgcolor=#fefefe
| 446614 ||  || — || January 28, 2014 || Mount Lemmon || Mount Lemmon Survey || — || align=right data-sort-value="0.94" | 940 m || 
|-id=615 bgcolor=#d6d6d6
| 446615 ||  || — || December 27, 2006 || Mount Lemmon || Mount Lemmon Survey || — || align=right | 2.4 km || 
|-id=616 bgcolor=#d6d6d6
| 446616 ||  || — || December 21, 2006 || Mount Lemmon || Mount Lemmon Survey || — || align=right | 5.2 km || 
|-id=617 bgcolor=#d6d6d6
| 446617 ||  || — || June 15, 2010 || WISE || WISE || Tj (2.97) || align=right | 3.4 km || 
|-id=618 bgcolor=#E9E9E9
| 446618 ||  || — || September 16, 1999 || Kitt Peak || Spacewatch || — || align=right | 1.0 km || 
|-id=619 bgcolor=#E9E9E9
| 446619 ||  || — || September 29, 2011 || Mount Lemmon || Mount Lemmon Survey || — || align=right | 2.3 km || 
|-id=620 bgcolor=#E9E9E9
| 446620 ||  || — || January 1, 2009 || Kitt Peak || Spacewatch || — || align=right | 1.8 km || 
|-id=621 bgcolor=#E9E9E9
| 446621 ||  || — || September 9, 2007 || Kitt Peak || Spacewatch || — || align=right | 1.4 km || 
|-id=622 bgcolor=#E9E9E9
| 446622 ||  || — || December 29, 2008 || Kitt Peak || Spacewatch || — || align=right data-sort-value="0.81" | 810 m || 
|-id=623 bgcolor=#d6d6d6
| 446623 ||  || — || September 25, 2006 || Kitt Peak || Spacewatch || KOR || align=right | 1.1 km || 
|-id=624 bgcolor=#d6d6d6
| 446624 ||  || — || November 22, 2006 || Mount Lemmon || Mount Lemmon Survey || — || align=right | 3.5 km || 
|-id=625 bgcolor=#E9E9E9
| 446625 ||  || — || May 15, 2005 || Mount Lemmon || Mount Lemmon Survey || AGN || align=right | 1.4 km || 
|-id=626 bgcolor=#E9E9E9
| 446626 ||  || — || August 29, 2006 || Kitt Peak || Spacewatch || AGN || align=right | 1.1 km || 
|-id=627 bgcolor=#fefefe
| 446627 ||  || — || November 21, 2005 || Catalina || CSS || — || align=right data-sort-value="0.89" | 890 m || 
|-id=628 bgcolor=#d6d6d6
| 446628 ||  || — || December 2, 2005 || Socorro || LINEAR || — || align=right | 4.5 km || 
|-id=629 bgcolor=#fefefe
| 446629 ||  || — || December 2, 2008 || Mount Lemmon || Mount Lemmon Survey || — || align=right | 1.3 km || 
|-id=630 bgcolor=#d6d6d6
| 446630 ||  || — || October 1, 2005 || Kitt Peak || Spacewatch || THM || align=right | 2.4 km || 
|-id=631 bgcolor=#E9E9E9
| 446631 ||  || — || December 4, 2007 || Mount Lemmon || Mount Lemmon Survey || — || align=right | 2.3 km || 
|-id=632 bgcolor=#d6d6d6
| 446632 ||  || — || October 25, 2005 || Kitt Peak || Spacewatch || — || align=right | 2.4 km || 
|-id=633 bgcolor=#E9E9E9
| 446633 ||  || — || July 3, 2011 || Mount Lemmon || Mount Lemmon Survey || EUN || align=right data-sort-value="0.97" | 970 m || 
|-id=634 bgcolor=#E9E9E9
| 446634 ||  || — || October 5, 2003 || Kitt Peak || Spacewatch || — || align=right data-sort-value="0.98" | 980 m || 
|-id=635 bgcolor=#d6d6d6
| 446635 ||  || — || August 29, 2005 || Kitt Peak || Spacewatch || — || align=right | 3.8 km || 
|-id=636 bgcolor=#E9E9E9
| 446636 ||  || — || December 19, 2003 || Kitt Peak || Spacewatch || WIT || align=right | 1.1 km || 
|-id=637 bgcolor=#d6d6d6
| 446637 ||  || — || June 26, 2010 || WISE || WISE || — || align=right | 2.9 km || 
|-id=638 bgcolor=#fefefe
| 446638 ||  || — || November 9, 2008 || Kitt Peak || Spacewatch || — || align=right data-sort-value="0.98" | 980 m || 
|-id=639 bgcolor=#E9E9E9
| 446639 ||  || — || April 11, 2010 || Mount Lemmon || Mount Lemmon Survey || EUN || align=right | 1.1 km || 
|-id=640 bgcolor=#d6d6d6
| 446640 ||  || — || June 3, 2005 || Siding Spring || SSS || — || align=right | 1.9 km || 
|-id=641 bgcolor=#E9E9E9
| 446641 ||  || — || October 20, 2011 || Kitt Peak || Spacewatch || — || align=right | 1.5 km || 
|-id=642 bgcolor=#E9E9E9
| 446642 ||  || — || November 18, 2008 || Kitt Peak || Spacewatch || — || align=right | 1.3 km || 
|-id=643 bgcolor=#fefefe
| 446643 ||  || — || October 26, 2008 || Mount Lemmon || Mount Lemmon Survey || — || align=right data-sort-value="0.81" | 810 m || 
|-id=644 bgcolor=#d6d6d6
| 446644 ||  || — || November 25, 2005 || Kitt Peak || Spacewatch || — || align=right | 2.1 km || 
|-id=645 bgcolor=#E9E9E9
| 446645 ||  || — || October 19, 1995 || Kitt Peak || Spacewatch || — || align=right | 2.1 km || 
|-id=646 bgcolor=#E9E9E9
| 446646 ||  || — || October 23, 2008 || Mount Lemmon || Mount Lemmon Survey || — || align=right | 1.2 km || 
|-id=647 bgcolor=#d6d6d6
| 446647 ||  || — || July 11, 2004 || Socorro || LINEAR || — || align=right | 3.5 km || 
|-id=648 bgcolor=#E9E9E9
| 446648 ||  || — || February 14, 2004 || Kitt Peak || Spacewatch || — || align=right | 2.5 km || 
|-id=649 bgcolor=#E9E9E9
| 446649 ||  || — || August 21, 2006 || Kitt Peak || Spacewatch || — || align=right | 2.4 km || 
|-id=650 bgcolor=#E9E9E9
| 446650 ||  || — || September 4, 2007 || Catalina || CSS || — || align=right data-sort-value="0.83" | 830 m || 
|-id=651 bgcolor=#d6d6d6
| 446651 ||  || — || October 20, 2006 || Mount Lemmon || Mount Lemmon Survey || — || align=right | 3.0 km || 
|-id=652 bgcolor=#fefefe
| 446652 ||  || — || May 2, 2003 || Kitt Peak || Spacewatch || — || align=right | 1.1 km || 
|-id=653 bgcolor=#d6d6d6
| 446653 ||  || — || December 27, 2006 || Mount Lemmon || Mount Lemmon Survey || — || align=right | 2.8 km || 
|-id=654 bgcolor=#E9E9E9
| 446654 ||  || — || February 1, 2009 || Mount Lemmon || Mount Lemmon Survey || — || align=right | 2.5 km || 
|-id=655 bgcolor=#E9E9E9
| 446655 ||  || — || September 26, 2006 || Catalina || CSS || DOR || align=right | 2.1 km || 
|-id=656 bgcolor=#d6d6d6
| 446656 ||  || — || February 8, 2007 || Mount Lemmon || Mount Lemmon Survey || — || align=right | 3.9 km || 
|-id=657 bgcolor=#fefefe
| 446657 ||  || — || September 26, 2008 || Kitt Peak || Spacewatch || — || align=right data-sort-value="0.71" | 710 m || 
|-id=658 bgcolor=#fefefe
| 446658 ||  || — || October 8, 2008 || Mount Lemmon || Mount Lemmon Survey || — || align=right data-sort-value="0.78" | 780 m || 
|-id=659 bgcolor=#E9E9E9
| 446659 ||  || — || May 30, 2006 || Mount Lemmon || Mount Lemmon Survey || — || align=right | 2.0 km || 
|-id=660 bgcolor=#E9E9E9
| 446660 ||  || — || September 19, 2006 || Kitt Peak || Spacewatch || — || align=right | 2.4 km || 
|-id=661 bgcolor=#fefefe
| 446661 ||  || — || December 6, 2005 || Kitt Peak || Spacewatch || V || align=right data-sort-value="0.65" | 650 m || 
|-id=662 bgcolor=#fefefe
| 446662 ||  || — || June 16, 2004 || Siding Spring || SSS || — || align=right | 1.2 km || 
|-id=663 bgcolor=#fefefe
| 446663 ||  || — || July 11, 2004 || Socorro || LINEAR || — || align=right data-sort-value="0.75" | 750 m || 
|-id=664 bgcolor=#E9E9E9
| 446664 ||  || — || May 4, 2010 || Kitt Peak || Spacewatch || — || align=right | 1.9 km || 
|-id=665 bgcolor=#d6d6d6
| 446665 ||  || — || June 9, 2010 || WISE || WISE || — || align=right | 2.6 km || 
|-id=666 bgcolor=#fefefe
| 446666 ||  || — || October 4, 2004 || Kitt Peak || Spacewatch || — || align=right data-sort-value="0.82" | 820 m || 
|-id=667 bgcolor=#d6d6d6
| 446667 ||  || — || September 17, 2010 || Catalina || CSS || — || align=right | 2.5 km || 
|-id=668 bgcolor=#fefefe
| 446668 ||  || — || September 23, 2000 || Socorro || LINEAR || — || align=right | 1.00 km || 
|-id=669 bgcolor=#fefefe
| 446669 ||  || — || December 17, 2009 || Kitt Peak || Spacewatch || V || align=right data-sort-value="0.76" | 760 m || 
|-id=670 bgcolor=#fefefe
| 446670 ||  || — || June 26, 2011 || Mount Lemmon || Mount Lemmon Survey || — || align=right | 1.3 km || 
|-id=671 bgcolor=#d6d6d6
| 446671 ||  || — || December 14, 2007 || Mount Lemmon || Mount Lemmon Survey || — || align=right | 3.2 km || 
|-id=672 bgcolor=#fefefe
| 446672 ||  || — || January 31, 2006 || Mount Lemmon || Mount Lemmon Survey || NYS || align=right data-sort-value="0.59" | 590 m || 
|-id=673 bgcolor=#fefefe
| 446673 ||  || — || October 21, 2012 || Mount Lemmon || Mount Lemmon Survey || — || align=right data-sort-value="0.76" | 760 m || 
|-id=674 bgcolor=#fefefe
| 446674 ||  || — || November 25, 2009 || Mount Lemmon || Mount Lemmon Survey || — || align=right data-sort-value="0.73" | 730 m || 
|-id=675 bgcolor=#d6d6d6
| 446675 ||  || — || February 9, 2008 || Kitt Peak || Spacewatch || — || align=right | 3.6 km || 
|-id=676 bgcolor=#d6d6d6
| 446676 ||  || — || July 8, 2010 || WISE || WISE || THB || align=right | 3.9 km || 
|-id=677 bgcolor=#d6d6d6
| 446677 ||  || — || March 27, 2003 || Kitt Peak || Spacewatch || — || align=right | 2.9 km || 
|-id=678 bgcolor=#d6d6d6
| 446678 ||  || — || June 12, 2010 || WISE || WISE || — || align=right | 3.9 km || 
|-id=679 bgcolor=#E9E9E9
| 446679 ||  || — || March 25, 2010 || Mount Lemmon || Mount Lemmon Survey || — || align=right | 2.1 km || 
|-id=680 bgcolor=#d6d6d6
| 446680 ||  || — || August 31, 2005 || Kitt Peak || Spacewatch || — || align=right | 3.2 km || 
|-id=681 bgcolor=#fefefe
| 446681 ||  || — || January 24, 2007 || Kitt Peak || Spacewatch || — || align=right data-sort-value="0.61" | 610 m || 
|-id=682 bgcolor=#d6d6d6
| 446682 ||  || — || April 5, 2003 || Kitt Peak || Spacewatch || THM || align=right | 2.5 km || 
|-id=683 bgcolor=#d6d6d6
| 446683 ||  || — || March 8, 2005 || Mount Lemmon || Mount Lemmon Survey || 3:2 || align=right | 4.5 km || 
|-id=684 bgcolor=#fefefe
| 446684 ||  || — || September 23, 2008 || Kitt Peak || Spacewatch || — || align=right data-sort-value="0.82" | 820 m || 
|-id=685 bgcolor=#d6d6d6
| 446685 ||  || — || February 13, 2008 || Kitt Peak || Spacewatch || — || align=right | 2.4 km || 
|-id=686 bgcolor=#E9E9E9
| 446686 ||  || — || March 1, 2009 || Mount Lemmon || Mount Lemmon Survey || — || align=right | 2.2 km || 
|-id=687 bgcolor=#E9E9E9
| 446687 ||  || — || April 9, 2010 || Mount Lemmon || Mount Lemmon Survey || — || align=right data-sort-value="0.88" | 880 m || 
|-id=688 bgcolor=#E9E9E9
| 446688 ||  || — || December 31, 2008 || Kitt Peak || Spacewatch ||  || align=right | 1.3 km || 
|-id=689 bgcolor=#E9E9E9
| 446689 ||  || — || April 16, 2005 || Kitt Peak || Spacewatch || — || align=right | 2.1 km || 
|-id=690 bgcolor=#d6d6d6
| 446690 ||  || — || February 8, 2008 || Kitt Peak || Spacewatch || EOS || align=right | 1.5 km || 
|-id=691 bgcolor=#E9E9E9
| 446691 ||  || — || September 30, 2006 || Catalina || CSS || — || align=right | 2.6 km || 
|-id=692 bgcolor=#d6d6d6
| 446692 ||  || — || December 5, 2005 || Kitt Peak || Spacewatch || — || align=right | 4.8 km || 
|-id=693 bgcolor=#E9E9E9
| 446693 ||  || — || May 22, 2001 || Kitt Peak || Spacewatch || — || align=right | 1.9 km || 
|-id=694 bgcolor=#fefefe
| 446694 ||  || — || April 1, 2011 || Mount Lemmon || Mount Lemmon Survey || — || align=right data-sort-value="0.78" | 780 m || 
|-id=695 bgcolor=#E9E9E9
| 446695 ||  || — || September 11, 2007 || Catalina || CSS || — || align=right | 3.6 km || 
|-id=696 bgcolor=#fefefe
| 446696 ||  || — || May 3, 2011 || Mount Lemmon || Mount Lemmon Survey || — || align=right data-sort-value="0.82" | 820 m || 
|-id=697 bgcolor=#fefefe
| 446697 ||  || — || August 29, 2000 || Socorro || LINEAR || NYS || align=right data-sort-value="0.86" | 860 m || 
|-id=698 bgcolor=#E9E9E9
| 446698 ||  || — || July 6, 2010 || WISE || WISE || — || align=right | 4.1 km || 
|-id=699 bgcolor=#fefefe
| 446699 ||  || — || November 10, 2005 || Mount Lemmon || Mount Lemmon Survey || — || align=right | 1.3 km || 
|-id=700 bgcolor=#E9E9E9
| 446700 ||  || — || November 6, 2008 || Mount Lemmon || Mount Lemmon Survey || — || align=right | 1.2 km || 
|}

446701–446800 

|-bgcolor=#E9E9E9
| 446701 ||  || — || June 30, 2010 || WISE || WISE || EUN || align=right | 2.7 km || 
|-id=702 bgcolor=#fefefe
| 446702 ||  || — || March 2, 2006 || Kitt Peak || Spacewatch || — || align=right | 1.0 km || 
|-id=703 bgcolor=#d6d6d6
| 446703 ||  || — || October 11, 2010 || Catalina || CSS || — || align=right | 2.9 km || 
|-id=704 bgcolor=#fefefe
| 446704 ||  || — || October 26, 2005 || Kitt Peak || Spacewatch || V || align=right data-sort-value="0.78" | 780 m || 
|-id=705 bgcolor=#fefefe
| 446705 ||  || — || November 24, 2008 || Mount Lemmon || Mount Lemmon Survey || — || align=right data-sort-value="0.85" | 850 m || 
|-id=706 bgcolor=#E9E9E9
| 446706 ||  || — || February 16, 2004 || Kitt Peak || Spacewatch || — || align=right | 1.7 km || 
|-id=707 bgcolor=#E9E9E9
| 446707 ||  || — || November 5, 2007 || Mount Lemmon || Mount Lemmon Survey || — || align=right | 2.6 km || 
|-id=708 bgcolor=#d6d6d6
| 446708 ||  || — || March 26, 2009 || Kitt Peak || Spacewatch || — || align=right | 2.5 km || 
|-id=709 bgcolor=#fefefe
| 446709 ||  || — || July 16, 2004 || Socorro || LINEAR || — || align=right data-sort-value="0.78" | 780 m || 
|-id=710 bgcolor=#fefefe
| 446710 ||  || — || October 1, 2008 || Catalina || CSS || — || align=right data-sort-value="0.82" | 820 m || 
|-id=711 bgcolor=#d6d6d6
| 446711 ||  || — || August 20, 2004 || Kitt Peak || Spacewatch || — || align=right | 2.8 km || 
|-id=712 bgcolor=#E9E9E9
| 446712 ||  || — || April 8, 2010 || Kitt Peak || Spacewatch || — || align=right | 2.6 km || 
|-id=713 bgcolor=#E9E9E9
| 446713 ||  || — || August 19, 2006 || Kitt Peak || Spacewatch || — || align=right | 2.4 km || 
|-id=714 bgcolor=#d6d6d6
| 446714 ||  || — || September 10, 2004 || Kitt Peak || Spacewatch || — || align=right | 2.9 km || 
|-id=715 bgcolor=#d6d6d6
| 446715 ||  || — || September 7, 2004 || Kitt Peak || Spacewatch || — || align=right | 3.4 km || 
|-id=716 bgcolor=#E9E9E9
| 446716 ||  || — || December 10, 2004 || Kitt Peak || Spacewatch || EUN || align=right | 1.6 km || 
|-id=717 bgcolor=#E9E9E9
| 446717 ||  || — || November 15, 2007 || Catalina || CSS || — || align=right | 1.9 km || 
|-id=718 bgcolor=#E9E9E9
| 446718 ||  || — || June 22, 2006 || Mount Lemmon || Mount Lemmon Survey || critical || align=right | 1.4 km || 
|-id=719 bgcolor=#fefefe
| 446719 ||  || — || November 12, 2012 || Mount Lemmon || Mount Lemmon Survey || (2076) || align=right data-sort-value="0.71" | 710 m || 
|-id=720 bgcolor=#E9E9E9
| 446720 ||  || — || September 6, 2007 || Anderson Mesa || LONEOS || — || align=right data-sort-value="0.94" | 940 m || 
|-id=721 bgcolor=#fefefe
| 446721 ||  || — || December 27, 2006 || Mount Lemmon || Mount Lemmon Survey || — || align=right data-sort-value="0.98" | 980 m || 
|-id=722 bgcolor=#d6d6d6
| 446722 ||  || — || January 16, 2007 || Mount Lemmon || Mount Lemmon Survey || — || align=right | 3.3 km || 
|-id=723 bgcolor=#fefefe
| 446723 ||  || — || August 15, 2004 || Campo Imperatore || CINEOS || — || align=right data-sort-value="0.82" | 820 m || 
|-id=724 bgcolor=#E9E9E9
| 446724 ||  || — || January 25, 2009 || Kitt Peak || Spacewatch || EUN || align=right | 1.1 km || 
|-id=725 bgcolor=#E9E9E9
| 446725 ||  || — || December 19, 2007 || Kitt Peak || Spacewatch || — || align=right | 2.3 km || 
|-id=726 bgcolor=#d6d6d6
| 446726 ||  || — || February 10, 2008 || Kitt Peak || Spacewatch || — || align=right | 2.6 km || 
|-id=727 bgcolor=#fefefe
| 446727 ||  || — || April 8, 2008 || Kitt Peak || Spacewatch || — || align=right data-sort-value="0.71" | 710 m || 
|-id=728 bgcolor=#E9E9E9
| 446728 ||  || — || September 12, 2007 || Catalina || CSS || — || align=right | 1.1 km || 
|-id=729 bgcolor=#E9E9E9
| 446729 ||  || — || August 29, 2006 || Catalina || CSS || — || align=right | 2.5 km || 
|-id=730 bgcolor=#fefefe
| 446730 ||  || — || July 3, 2011 || Mount Lemmon || Mount Lemmon Survey || — || align=right | 1.3 km || 
|-id=731 bgcolor=#d6d6d6
| 446731 ||  || — || June 19, 2010 || WISE || WISE || — || align=right | 3.1 km || 
|-id=732 bgcolor=#d6d6d6
| 446732 ||  || — || October 4, 1999 || Kitt Peak || Spacewatch || — || align=right | 2.1 km || 
|-id=733 bgcolor=#d6d6d6
| 446733 ||  || — || September 12, 2004 || Socorro || LINEAR || — || align=right | 4.1 km || 
|-id=734 bgcolor=#d6d6d6
| 446734 ||  || — || September 11, 2004 || Socorro || LINEAR || — || align=right | 4.9 km || 
|-id=735 bgcolor=#fefefe
| 446735 ||  || — || January 27, 2006 || Mount Lemmon || Mount Lemmon Survey || — || align=right | 1.3 km || 
|-id=736 bgcolor=#fefefe
| 446736 ||  || — || February 17, 2010 || Kitt Peak || Spacewatch || — || align=right data-sort-value="0.88" | 880 m || 
|-id=737 bgcolor=#E9E9E9
| 446737 ||  || — || June 27, 2011 || Mount Lemmon || Mount Lemmon Survey || — || align=right data-sort-value="0.91" | 910 m || 
|-id=738 bgcolor=#d6d6d6
| 446738 ||  || — || September 7, 2004 || Socorro || LINEAR || — || align=right | 2.5 km || 
|-id=739 bgcolor=#E9E9E9
| 446739 ||  || — || October 22, 2011 || Mount Lemmon || Mount Lemmon Survey || — || align=right | 2.0 km || 
|-id=740 bgcolor=#fefefe
| 446740 ||  || — || September 27, 2000 || Kitt Peak || Spacewatch || — || align=right data-sort-value="0.91" | 910 m || 
|-id=741 bgcolor=#fefefe
| 446741 ||  || — || January 31, 2006 || Kitt Peak || Spacewatch || — || align=right data-sort-value="0.78" | 780 m || 
|-id=742 bgcolor=#FA8072
| 446742 ||  || — || October 23, 2006 || Siding Spring || SSS || — || align=right data-sort-value="0.83" | 830 m || 
|-id=743 bgcolor=#d6d6d6
| 446743 ||  || — || June 23, 2010 || WISE || WISE || — || align=right | 2.3 km || 
|-id=744 bgcolor=#d6d6d6
| 446744 ||  || — || April 24, 2010 || WISE || WISE || — || align=right | 3.2 km || 
|-id=745 bgcolor=#fefefe
| 446745 ||  || — || December 29, 2008 || Kitt Peak || Spacewatch || NYS || align=right data-sort-value="0.82" | 820 m || 
|-id=746 bgcolor=#E9E9E9
| 446746 ||  || — || May 22, 2006 || Mount Lemmon || Mount Lemmon Survey || — || align=right | 3.2 km || 
|-id=747 bgcolor=#fefefe
| 446747 ||  || — || January 16, 2005 || Kitt Peak || Spacewatch || — || align=right data-sort-value="0.79" | 790 m || 
|-id=748 bgcolor=#d6d6d6
| 446748 ||  || — || August 9, 2004 || Anderson Mesa || LONEOS || — || align=right | 3.1 km || 
|-id=749 bgcolor=#d6d6d6
| 446749 ||  || — || February 10, 2008 || Kitt Peak || Spacewatch || BRA || align=right | 2.0 km || 
|-id=750 bgcolor=#fefefe
| 446750 ||  || — || April 19, 2007 || Kitt Peak || Spacewatch || — || align=right data-sort-value="0.98" | 980 m || 
|-id=751 bgcolor=#d6d6d6
| 446751 ||  || — || January 31, 2003 || Kitt Peak || Spacewatch || — || align=right | 4.5 km || 
|-id=752 bgcolor=#fefefe
| 446752 ||  || — || April 25, 2004 || Kitt Peak || Spacewatch || (2076) || align=right data-sort-value="0.81" | 810 m || 
|-id=753 bgcolor=#d6d6d6
| 446753 ||  || — || July 8, 2010 || WISE || WISE || — || align=right | 4.8 km || 
|-id=754 bgcolor=#fefefe
| 446754 ||  || — || August 3, 2008 || Siding Spring || SSS || — || align=right | 1.9 km || 
|-id=755 bgcolor=#fefefe
| 446755 ||  || — || March 28, 2008 || Kitt Peak || Spacewatch || — || align=right data-sort-value="0.58" | 580 m || 
|-id=756 bgcolor=#fefefe
| 446756 ||  || — || January 30, 2006 || Kitt Peak || Spacewatch || — || align=right | 1.1 km || 
|-id=757 bgcolor=#fefefe
| 446757 ||  || — || November 20, 2008 || Kitt Peak || Spacewatch || — || align=right | 1.2 km || 
|-id=758 bgcolor=#d6d6d6
| 446758 ||  || — || July 29, 2010 || WISE || WISE || — || align=right | 3.0 km || 
|-id=759 bgcolor=#fefefe
| 446759 ||  || — || September 8, 2004 || Socorro || LINEAR || NYS || align=right data-sort-value="0.69" | 690 m || 
|-id=760 bgcolor=#fefefe
| 446760 ||  || — || December 4, 2008 || Kitt Peak || Spacewatch || — || align=right data-sort-value="0.95" | 950 m || 
|-id=761 bgcolor=#fefefe
| 446761 ||  || — || September 13, 1996 || Kitt Peak || Spacewatch || — || align=right data-sort-value="0.98" | 980 m || 
|-id=762 bgcolor=#E9E9E9
| 446762 ||  || — || September 14, 2007 || Kitt Peak || Spacewatch || — || align=right | 1.0 km || 
|-id=763 bgcolor=#E9E9E9
| 446763 ||  || — || March 12, 2010 || WISE || WISE || DOR || align=right | 2.9 km || 
|-id=764 bgcolor=#fefefe
| 446764 ||  || — || July 2, 2011 || Siding Spring || SSS || — || align=right | 1.0 km || 
|-id=765 bgcolor=#d6d6d6
| 446765 ||  || — || September 10, 2010 || Kitt Peak || Spacewatch || — || align=right | 2.7 km || 
|-id=766 bgcolor=#E9E9E9
| 446766 ||  || — || January 16, 1996 || Kitt Peak || Spacewatch || — || align=right | 1.9 km || 
|-id=767 bgcolor=#E9E9E9
| 446767 ||  || — || October 12, 2007 || Mount Lemmon || Mount Lemmon Survey || — || align=right | 1.4 km || 
|-id=768 bgcolor=#E9E9E9
| 446768 ||  || — || November 8, 2007 || Kitt Peak || Spacewatch || — || align=right | 2.0 km || 
|-id=769 bgcolor=#E9E9E9
| 446769 ||  || — || November 5, 2007 || Mount Lemmon || Mount Lemmon Survey || — || align=right | 1.6 km || 
|-id=770 bgcolor=#E9E9E9
| 446770 ||  || — || January 16, 2009 || Kitt Peak || Spacewatch || — || align=right | 1.4 km || 
|-id=771 bgcolor=#fefefe
| 446771 ||  || — || September 11, 2004 || Kitt Peak || Spacewatch || MAS || align=right data-sort-value="0.63" | 630 m || 
|-id=772 bgcolor=#fefefe
| 446772 ||  || — || March 16, 2007 || Kitt Peak || Spacewatch || — || align=right data-sort-value="0.79" | 790 m || 
|-id=773 bgcolor=#E9E9E9
| 446773 ||  || — || July 1, 2005 || Kitt Peak || Spacewatch || — || align=right | 3.1 km || 
|-id=774 bgcolor=#E9E9E9
| 446774 ||  || — || June 11, 2005 || Kitt Peak || Spacewatch || — || align=right | 1.9 km || 
|-id=775 bgcolor=#fefefe
| 446775 ||  || — || January 8, 2010 || Mount Lemmon || Mount Lemmon Survey || — || align=right | 1.1 km || 
|-id=776 bgcolor=#fefefe
| 446776 ||  || — || June 28, 2008 || Siding Spring || SSS || — || align=right data-sort-value="0.71" | 710 m || 
|-id=777 bgcolor=#fefefe
| 446777 ||  || — || September 24, 2008 || Kitt Peak || Spacewatch || NYS || align=right data-sort-value="0.65" | 650 m || 
|-id=778 bgcolor=#fefefe
| 446778 ||  || — || December 31, 2008 || Kitt Peak || Spacewatch || NYS || align=right data-sort-value="0.72" | 720 m || 
|-id=779 bgcolor=#d6d6d6
| 446779 ||  || — || March 9, 2008 || Kitt Peak || Spacewatch || — || align=right | 3.0 km || 
|-id=780 bgcolor=#E9E9E9
| 446780 ||  || — || March 17, 2010 || Siding Spring || SSS || EUN || align=right | 1.5 km || 
|-id=781 bgcolor=#E9E9E9
| 446781 ||  || — || November 3, 2007 || Catalina || CSS || — || align=right | 1.5 km || 
|-id=782 bgcolor=#E9E9E9
| 446782 ||  || — || September 5, 2003 || Campo Imperatore || CINEOS || — || align=right | 1.1 km || 
|-id=783 bgcolor=#fefefe
| 446783 ||  || — || October 12, 1993 || Kitt Peak || Spacewatch || — || align=right data-sort-value="0.68" | 680 m || 
|-id=784 bgcolor=#d6d6d6
| 446784 ||  || — || September 18, 1995 || Kitt Peak || Spacewatch || — || align=right | 2.0 km || 
|-id=785 bgcolor=#E9E9E9
| 446785 ||  || — || October 19, 1995 || Kitt Peak || Spacewatch || — || align=right data-sort-value="0.68" | 680 m || 
|-id=786 bgcolor=#fefefe
| 446786 || 1996 GD || — || April 7, 1996 || Haleakala || AMOS || — || align=right | 1.6 km || 
|-id=787 bgcolor=#fefefe
| 446787 ||  || — || October 5, 1997 || Kitt Peak || Spacewatch || critical || align=right data-sort-value="0.54" | 540 m || 
|-id=788 bgcolor=#fefefe
| 446788 ||  || — || November 23, 1997 || Kitt Peak || Spacewatch || MAS || align=right data-sort-value="0.65" | 650 m || 
|-id=789 bgcolor=#FFC2E0
| 446789 ||  || — || March 24, 1998 || Socorro || LINEAR || AMO || align=right data-sort-value="0.25" | 250 m || 
|-id=790 bgcolor=#E9E9E9
| 446790 ||  || — || September 14, 1998 || Socorro || LINEAR || — || align=right | 1.9 km || 
|-id=791 bgcolor=#FFC2E0
| 446791 ||  || — || September 26, 1998 || Socorro || LINEAR || APOPHA || align=right data-sort-value="0.78" | 780 m || 
|-id=792 bgcolor=#E9E9E9
| 446792 ||  || — || October 13, 1998 || Kitt Peak || Spacewatch || — || align=right | 1.3 km || 
|-id=793 bgcolor=#E9E9E9
| 446793 ||  || — || October 20, 1998 || Caussols || ODAS || (5) || align=right | 1.0 km || 
|-id=794 bgcolor=#E9E9E9
| 446794 ||  || — || October 19, 1998 || Kitt Peak || Spacewatch || — || align=right | 1.1 km || 
|-id=795 bgcolor=#d6d6d6
| 446795 ||  || — || September 7, 1999 || Socorro || LINEAR || — || align=right | 3.1 km || 
|-id=796 bgcolor=#d6d6d6
| 446796 ||  || — || October 9, 1999 || Kitt Peak || Spacewatch || 3:2 || align=right | 4.7 km || 
|-id=797 bgcolor=#d6d6d6
| 446797 ||  || — || September 4, 1999 || Kitt Peak || Spacewatch || — || align=right | 2.3 km || 
|-id=798 bgcolor=#d6d6d6
| 446798 ||  || — || October 12, 1999 || Kitt Peak || Spacewatch || SHU3:2 || align=right | 5.1 km || 
|-id=799 bgcolor=#fefefe
| 446799 ||  || — || October 2, 1999 || Socorro || LINEAR || — || align=right data-sort-value="0.76" | 760 m || 
|-id=800 bgcolor=#fefefe
| 446800 ||  || — || October 12, 1999 || Socorro || LINEAR || H || align=right data-sort-value="0.84" | 840 m || 
|}

446801–446900 

|-bgcolor=#fefefe
| 446801 ||  || — || October 10, 1999 || Socorro || LINEAR || — || align=right data-sort-value="0.72" | 720 m || 
|-id=802 bgcolor=#E9E9E9
| 446802 ||  || — || October 9, 1999 || Socorro || LINEAR || — || align=right | 1.2 km || 
|-id=803 bgcolor=#d6d6d6
| 446803 ||  || — || October 19, 1999 || Kitt Peak || Spacewatch || EOS || align=right | 2.0 km || 
|-id=804 bgcolor=#FFC2E0
| 446804 ||  || — || November 4, 1999 || Anderson Mesa || LONEOS || AMOcritical || align=right data-sort-value="0.45" | 450 m || 
|-id=805 bgcolor=#fefefe
| 446805 ||  || — || October 9, 1999 || Socorro || LINEAR || — || align=right | 1.1 km || 
|-id=806 bgcolor=#d6d6d6
| 446806 ||  || — || November 5, 1999 || Kitt Peak || Spacewatch || THM || align=right | 1.8 km || 
|-id=807 bgcolor=#E9E9E9
| 446807 ||  || — || November 9, 1999 || Socorro || LINEAR || — || align=right | 1.2 km || 
|-id=808 bgcolor=#d6d6d6
| 446808 ||  || — || November 11, 1999 || Kitt Peak || Spacewatch || — || align=right | 2.2 km || 
|-id=809 bgcolor=#E9E9E9
| 446809 ||  || — || November 9, 1999 || Kitt Peak || Spacewatch || — || align=right data-sort-value="0.78" | 780 m || 
|-id=810 bgcolor=#fefefe
| 446810 ||  || — || November 9, 1999 || Socorro || LINEAR || H || align=right data-sort-value="0.65" | 650 m || 
|-id=811 bgcolor=#d6d6d6
| 446811 ||  || — || November 17, 1999 || Kitt Peak || Spacewatch || — || align=right | 1.6 km || 
|-id=812 bgcolor=#d6d6d6
| 446812 ||  || — || December 7, 1999 || Socorro || LINEAR || — || align=right | 4.5 km || 
|-id=813 bgcolor=#d6d6d6
| 446813 ||  || — || November 2, 1999 || Kitt Peak || Spacewatch || — || align=right | 3.0 km || 
|-id=814 bgcolor=#d6d6d6
| 446814 ||  || — || January 5, 2000 || Kitt Peak || Spacewatch || — || align=right | 3.6 km || 
|-id=815 bgcolor=#E9E9E9
| 446815 ||  || — || January 29, 2000 || Socorro || LINEAR || — || align=right | 1.8 km || 
|-id=816 bgcolor=#FA8072
| 446816 ||  || — || March 8, 2000 || Socorro || LINEAR || unusualcritical || align=right | 1.8 km || 
|-id=817 bgcolor=#E9E9E9
| 446817 ||  || — || April 2, 2000 || Kitt Peak || Spacewatch || — || align=right | 1.4 km || 
|-id=818 bgcolor=#E9E9E9
| 446818 ||  || — || April 5, 2000 || Kitt Peak || Spacewatch || — || align=right | 2.5 km || 
|-id=819 bgcolor=#FA8072
| 446819 ||  || — || September 5, 2000 || Anderson Mesa || LONEOS || — || align=right | 2.3 km || 
|-id=820 bgcolor=#fefefe
| 446820 ||  || — || September 24, 2000 || Socorro || LINEAR || — || align=right data-sort-value="0.90" | 900 m || 
|-id=821 bgcolor=#fefefe
| 446821 ||  || — || September 28, 2000 || Kitt Peak || Spacewatch || MAS || align=right data-sort-value="0.78" | 780 m || 
|-id=822 bgcolor=#d6d6d6
| 446822 ||  || — || November 20, 2000 || Socorro || LINEAR || — || align=right | 3.0 km || 
|-id=823 bgcolor=#E9E9E9
| 446823 ||  || — || March 26, 2001 || Socorro || LINEAR || — || align=right | 2.0 km || 
|-id=824 bgcolor=#E9E9E9
| 446824 ||  || — || March 21, 2001 || Kitt Peak || Spacewatch || — || align=right | 1.3 km || 
|-id=825 bgcolor=#FA8072
| 446825 ||  || — || July 21, 2001 || Palomar || NEAT || — || align=right data-sort-value="0.78" | 780 m || 
|-id=826 bgcolor=#FFC2E0
| 446826 ||  || — || August 6, 2001 || Haleakala || NEAT || AMO +1kmcritical || align=right data-sort-value="0.81" | 810 m || 
|-id=827 bgcolor=#E9E9E9
| 446827 ||  || — || August 23, 2001 || Anderson Mesa || LONEOS || CLO || align=right | 1.9 km || 
|-id=828 bgcolor=#fefefe
| 446828 ||  || — || August 25, 2001 || Socorro || LINEAR || — || align=right data-sort-value="0.94" | 940 m || 
|-id=829 bgcolor=#E9E9E9
| 446829 ||  || — || August 23, 2001 || Anderson Mesa || LONEOS || — || align=right | 2.4 km || 
|-id=830 bgcolor=#fefefe
| 446830 ||  || — || August 24, 2001 || Anderson Mesa || LONEOS || — || align=right data-sort-value="0.94" | 940 m || 
|-id=831 bgcolor=#E9E9E9
| 446831 ||  || — || August 24, 2001 || Socorro || LINEAR || — || align=right | 3.4 km || 
|-id=832 bgcolor=#E9E9E9
| 446832 ||  || — || August 19, 2001 || Cerro Tololo || M. W. Buie || — || align=right | 1.9 km || 
|-id=833 bgcolor=#FFC2E0
| 446833 ||  || — || September 10, 2001 || Socorro || LINEAR || APO || align=right data-sort-value="0.22" | 220 m || 
|-id=834 bgcolor=#E9E9E9
| 446834 ||  || — || September 12, 2001 || Socorro || LINEAR || — || align=right | 2.2 km || 
|-id=835 bgcolor=#E9E9E9
| 446835 ||  || — || September 20, 2001 || Socorro || LINEAR || EUN || align=right | 2.3 km || 
|-id=836 bgcolor=#fefefe
| 446836 ||  || — || September 20, 2001 || Socorro || LINEAR || — || align=right data-sort-value="0.57" | 570 m || 
|-id=837 bgcolor=#fefefe
| 446837 ||  || — || September 20, 2001 || Socorro || LINEAR || — || align=right | 2.4 km || 
|-id=838 bgcolor=#fefefe
| 446838 ||  || — || September 16, 2001 || Socorro || LINEAR || — || align=right | 1.1 km || 
|-id=839 bgcolor=#E9E9E9
| 446839 ||  || — || September 16, 2001 || Socorro || LINEAR || — || align=right | 1.8 km || 
|-id=840 bgcolor=#E9E9E9
| 446840 ||  || — || September 16, 2001 || Socorro || LINEAR || — || align=right | 2.0 km || 
|-id=841 bgcolor=#fefefe
| 446841 ||  || — || September 17, 2001 || Socorro || LINEAR || — || align=right data-sort-value="0.74" | 740 m || 
|-id=842 bgcolor=#E9E9E9
| 446842 ||  || — || September 19, 2001 || Socorro || LINEAR || — || align=right | 2.0 km || 
|-id=843 bgcolor=#E9E9E9
| 446843 ||  || — || September 19, 2001 || Socorro || LINEAR || — || align=right | 2.5 km || 
|-id=844 bgcolor=#fefefe
| 446844 ||  || — || September 18, 2001 || Kitt Peak || Spacewatch || — || align=right data-sort-value="0.90" | 900 m || 
|-id=845 bgcolor=#fefefe
| 446845 ||  || — || September 25, 2001 || Socorro || LINEAR || — || align=right | 1.1 km || 
|-id=846 bgcolor=#E9E9E9
| 446846 ||  || — || September 12, 2001 || Socorro || LINEAR || — || align=right | 1.7 km || 
|-id=847 bgcolor=#E9E9E9
| 446847 ||  || — || September 19, 2001 || Palomar || NEAT || — || align=right | 4.2 km || 
|-id=848 bgcolor=#fefefe
| 446848 ||  || — || October 14, 2001 || Socorro || LINEAR || — || align=right data-sort-value="0.59" | 590 m || 
|-id=849 bgcolor=#fefefe
| 446849 ||  || — || October 14, 2001 || Socorro || LINEAR || — || align=right data-sort-value="0.98" | 980 m || 
|-id=850 bgcolor=#fefefe
| 446850 ||  || — || October 14, 2001 || Socorro || LINEAR || critical || align=right data-sort-value="0.59" | 590 m || 
|-id=851 bgcolor=#fefefe
| 446851 ||  || — || October 14, 2001 || Socorro || LINEAR || — || align=right data-sort-value="0.78" | 780 m || 
|-id=852 bgcolor=#E9E9E9
| 446852 ||  || — || October 11, 2001 || Palomar || NEAT || — || align=right | 2.0 km || 
|-id=853 bgcolor=#fefefe
| 446853 ||  || — || October 17, 2001 || Socorro || LINEAR || critical || align=right data-sort-value="0.62" | 620 m || 
|-id=854 bgcolor=#fefefe
| 446854 ||  || — || October 20, 2001 || Socorro || LINEAR || — || align=right data-sort-value="0.78" | 780 m || 
|-id=855 bgcolor=#FA8072
| 446855 ||  || — || October 17, 2001 || Haleakala || NEAT || — || align=right data-sort-value="0.80" | 800 m || 
|-id=856 bgcolor=#fefefe
| 446856 ||  || — || October 17, 2001 || Socorro || LINEAR || — || align=right data-sort-value="0.78" | 780 m || 
|-id=857 bgcolor=#E9E9E9
| 446857 ||  || — || October 17, 2001 || Socorro || LINEAR || — || align=right | 2.8 km || 
|-id=858 bgcolor=#E9E9E9
| 446858 ||  || — || September 21, 2001 || Socorro || LINEAR || — || align=right | 2.5 km || 
|-id=859 bgcolor=#fefefe
| 446859 ||  || — || October 23, 2001 || Socorro || LINEAR || critical || align=right data-sort-value="0.71" | 710 m || 
|-id=860 bgcolor=#fefefe
| 446860 ||  || — || October 23, 2001 || Socorro || LINEAR || critical || align=right data-sort-value="0.54" | 540 m || 
|-id=861 bgcolor=#fefefe
| 446861 ||  || — || November 9, 2001 || Socorro || LINEAR || — || align=right data-sort-value="0.87" | 870 m || 
|-id=862 bgcolor=#FFC2E0
| 446862 ||  || — || November 12, 2001 || Socorro || LINEAR || APOPHAcritical || align=right data-sort-value="0.31" | 310 m || 
|-id=863 bgcolor=#fefefe
| 446863 ||  || — || November 15, 2001 || Socorro || LINEAR || — || align=right data-sort-value="0.90" | 900 m || 
|-id=864 bgcolor=#d6d6d6
| 446864 ||  || — || November 17, 2001 || Socorro || LINEAR || — || align=right | 2.5 km || 
|-id=865 bgcolor=#E9E9E9
| 446865 ||  || — || December 9, 2001 || Socorro || LINEAR || — || align=right | 2.2 km || 
|-id=866 bgcolor=#E9E9E9
| 446866 ||  || — || December 10, 2001 || Kitt Peak || Spacewatch || GEF || align=right | 1.1 km || 
|-id=867 bgcolor=#fefefe
| 446867 ||  || — || December 11, 2001 || Socorro || LINEAR || — || align=right data-sort-value="0.76" | 760 m || 
|-id=868 bgcolor=#fefefe
| 446868 ||  || — || December 10, 2001 || Socorro || LINEAR || — || align=right data-sort-value="0.85" | 850 m || 
|-id=869 bgcolor=#fefefe
| 446869 ||  || — || December 11, 2001 || Socorro || LINEAR || — || align=right data-sort-value="0.89" | 890 m || 
|-id=870 bgcolor=#fefefe
| 446870 ||  || — || December 14, 2001 || Socorro || LINEAR || — || align=right data-sort-value="0.76" | 760 m || 
|-id=871 bgcolor=#fefefe
| 446871 ||  || — || December 17, 2001 || Socorro || LINEAR || — || align=right data-sort-value="0.66" | 660 m || 
|-id=872 bgcolor=#fefefe
| 446872 ||  || — || December 17, 2001 || Socorro || LINEAR || — || align=right | 1.3 km || 
|-id=873 bgcolor=#fefefe
| 446873 ||  || — || December 17, 2001 || Socorro || LINEAR || — || align=right data-sort-value="0.86" | 860 m || 
|-id=874 bgcolor=#fefefe
| 446874 ||  || — || December 18, 2001 || Socorro || LINEAR || — || align=right | 1.2 km || 
|-id=875 bgcolor=#fefefe
| 446875 ||  || — || December 18, 2001 || Socorro || LINEAR || — || align=right data-sort-value="0.74" | 740 m || 
|-id=876 bgcolor=#FA8072
| 446876 ||  || — || December 11, 2001 || Socorro || LINEAR || — || align=right data-sort-value="0.86" | 860 m || 
|-id=877 bgcolor=#fefefe
| 446877 ||  || — || January 9, 2002 || Socorro || LINEAR || — || align=right data-sort-value="0.62" | 620 m || 
|-id=878 bgcolor=#fefefe
| 446878 ||  || — || December 17, 2001 || Socorro || LINEAR || — || align=right data-sort-value="0.86" | 860 m || 
|-id=879 bgcolor=#d6d6d6
| 446879 ||  || — || February 7, 2002 || Kitt Peak || Spacewatch || — || align=right | 2.2 km || 
|-id=880 bgcolor=#fefefe
| 446880 ||  || — || February 10, 2002 || Socorro || LINEAR || NYS || align=right data-sort-value="0.55" | 550 m || 
|-id=881 bgcolor=#d6d6d6
| 446881 ||  || — || February 13, 2002 || Kitt Peak || Spacewatch || EOS || align=right | 2.1 km || 
|-id=882 bgcolor=#fefefe
| 446882 ||  || — || February 16, 2002 || Palomar || NEAT || — || align=right data-sort-value="0.77" | 770 m || 
|-id=883 bgcolor=#d6d6d6
| 446883 ||  || — || February 16, 2002 || Palomar || NEAT || — || align=right | 3.4 km || 
|-id=884 bgcolor=#d6d6d6
| 446884 ||  || — || February 9, 2002 || Kitt Peak || Spacewatch || — || align=right | 3.9 km || 
|-id=885 bgcolor=#d6d6d6
| 446885 ||  || — || March 16, 2002 || Kitt Peak || Spacewatch || EOS || align=right | 2.5 km || 
|-id=886 bgcolor=#fefefe
| 446886 ||  || — || March 20, 2002 || Kitt Peak || Spacewatch || NYS || align=right data-sort-value="0.80" | 800 m || 
|-id=887 bgcolor=#d6d6d6
| 446887 ||  || — || April 10, 2002 || Socorro || LINEAR || — || align=right | 4.1 km || 
|-id=888 bgcolor=#E9E9E9
| 446888 ||  || — || May 6, 2002 || Socorro || LINEAR || — || align=right | 2.3 km || 
|-id=889 bgcolor=#FA8072
| 446889 ||  || — || May 11, 2002 || Socorro || LINEAR || — || align=right | 1.3 km || 
|-id=890 bgcolor=#d6d6d6
| 446890 ||  || — || April 18, 2002 || Kitt Peak || Spacewatch || — || align=right | 3.2 km || 
|-id=891 bgcolor=#d6d6d6
| 446891 ||  || — || May 10, 2002 || Palomar || NEAT || — || align=right | 3.2 km || 
|-id=892 bgcolor=#d6d6d6
| 446892 ||  || — || February 13, 2002 || Kitt Peak || Spacewatch || — || align=right | 3.3 km || 
|-id=893 bgcolor=#E9E9E9
| 446893 ||  || — || July 4, 2002 || Kitt Peak || Spacewatch || MAR || align=right | 1.0 km || 
|-id=894 bgcolor=#E9E9E9
| 446894 ||  || — || July 5, 2002 || Palomar || NEAT || — || align=right | 1.2 km || 
|-id=895 bgcolor=#FA8072
| 446895 ||  || — || August 10, 2002 || Socorro || LINEAR || — || align=right | 2.3 km || 
|-id=896 bgcolor=#E9E9E9
| 446896 ||  || — || August 8, 2002 || Palomar || NEAT || — || align=right | 1.4 km || 
|-id=897 bgcolor=#E9E9E9
| 446897 ||  || — || August 8, 2002 || Palomar || NEAT || — || align=right data-sort-value="0.84" | 840 m || 
|-id=898 bgcolor=#E9E9E9
| 446898 ||  || — || August 15, 2002 || Palomar || NEAT || — || align=right | 1.4 km || 
|-id=899 bgcolor=#E9E9E9
| 446899 ||  || — || August 15, 2002 || Palomar || NEAT || — || align=right | 1.2 km || 
|-id=900 bgcolor=#E9E9E9
| 446900 ||  || — || August 29, 2002 || Palomar || NEAT || — || align=right | 1.3 km || 
|}

446901–447000 

|-bgcolor=#E9E9E9
| 446901 ||  || — || August 17, 2002 || Palomar || NEAT || — || align=right | 1.6 km || 
|-id=902 bgcolor=#E9E9E9
| 446902 ||  || — || August 16, 2002 || Palomar || NEAT || — || align=right | 1.1 km || 
|-id=903 bgcolor=#fefefe
| 446903 ||  || — || August 28, 2002 || Palomar || NEAT || — || align=right data-sort-value="0.59" | 590 m || 
|-id=904 bgcolor=#E9E9E9
| 446904 ||  || — || January 28, 2000 || Kitt Peak || Spacewatch || EUN || align=right | 1.0 km || 
|-id=905 bgcolor=#E9E9E9
| 446905 ||  || — || August 16, 2002 || Palomar || NEAT || — || align=right | 1.5 km || 
|-id=906 bgcolor=#E9E9E9
| 446906 ||  || — || September 3, 2002 || Palomar || NEAT || — || align=right | 3.1 km || 
|-id=907 bgcolor=#E9E9E9
| 446907 ||  || — || September 4, 2002 || Anderson Mesa || LONEOS || — || align=right | 1.2 km || 
|-id=908 bgcolor=#E9E9E9
| 446908 ||  || — || September 4, 2002 || Palomar || NEAT || — || align=right | 1.2 km || 
|-id=909 bgcolor=#d6d6d6
| 446909 ||  || — || September 5, 2002 || Socorro || LINEAR || 7:4 || align=right | 3.4 km || 
|-id=910 bgcolor=#E9E9E9
| 446910 ||  || — || September 11, 2002 || Haleakala || NEAT || — || align=right | 1.3 km || 
|-id=911 bgcolor=#E9E9E9
| 446911 ||  || — || September 5, 2002 || Socorro || LINEAR || — || align=right | 1.5 km || 
|-id=912 bgcolor=#E9E9E9
| 446912 ||  || — || September 14, 2002 || Palomar || NEAT || — || align=right | 1.5 km || 
|-id=913 bgcolor=#fefefe
| 446913 ||  || — || September 14, 2002 || Palomar || R. Matson || H || align=right data-sort-value="0.69" | 690 m || 
|-id=914 bgcolor=#E9E9E9
| 446914 ||  || — || September 15, 2002 || Palomar || NEAT || — || align=right | 1.4 km || 
|-id=915 bgcolor=#E9E9E9
| 446915 ||  || — || September 4, 2002 || Palomar || NEAT || EUN || align=right | 1.2 km || 
|-id=916 bgcolor=#E9E9E9
| 446916 ||  || — || September 26, 2002 || Palomar || NEAT || JUN || align=right | 1.8 km || 
|-id=917 bgcolor=#fefefe
| 446917 ||  || — || October 2, 2002 || Socorro || LINEAR || — || align=right data-sort-value="0.82" | 820 m || 
|-id=918 bgcolor=#E9E9E9
| 446918 ||  || — || October 3, 2002 || Palomar || NEAT || EUN || align=right | 1.4 km || 
|-id=919 bgcolor=#E9E9E9
| 446919 ||  || — || October 3, 2002 || Socorro || LINEAR || — || align=right | 1.5 km || 
|-id=920 bgcolor=#E9E9E9
| 446920 ||  || — || October 11, 2002 || Socorro || LINEAR || EUN || align=right | 1.5 km || 
|-id=921 bgcolor=#fefefe
| 446921 ||  || — || October 4, 2002 || Apache Point || SDSS || — || align=right data-sort-value="0.66" | 660 m || 
|-id=922 bgcolor=#E9E9E9
| 446922 ||  || — || October 16, 2002 || Palomar || NEAT || — || align=right | 1.4 km || 
|-id=923 bgcolor=#FA8072
| 446923 ||  || — || November 3, 2002 || Palomar || NEAT || H || align=right | 1.0 km || 
|-id=924 bgcolor=#FFC2E0
| 446924 ||  || — || November 7, 2002 || Socorro || LINEAR || ATE || align=right data-sort-value="0.33" | 330 m || 
|-id=925 bgcolor=#E9E9E9
| 446925 ||  || — || November 5, 2002 || Socorro || LINEAR || — || align=right | 1.2 km || 
|-id=926 bgcolor=#E9E9E9
| 446926 ||  || — || November 6, 2002 || Anderson Mesa || LONEOS || — || align=right | 2.4 km || 
|-id=927 bgcolor=#E9E9E9
| 446927 ||  || — || November 5, 2002 || Socorro || LINEAR || — || align=right | 1.8 km || 
|-id=928 bgcolor=#E9E9E9
| 446928 ||  || — || November 12, 2002 || Socorro || LINEAR || — || align=right | 1.7 km || 
|-id=929 bgcolor=#E9E9E9
| 446929 ||  || — || November 12, 2002 || Socorro || LINEAR || — || align=right | 2.5 km || 
|-id=930 bgcolor=#E9E9E9
| 446930 ||  || — || November 4, 2002 || Palomar || NEAT || — || align=right | 2.0 km || 
|-id=931 bgcolor=#E9E9E9
| 446931 ||  || — || November 4, 2002 || Palomar || NEAT || — || align=right | 1.5 km || 
|-id=932 bgcolor=#E9E9E9
| 446932 ||  || — || November 27, 2002 || Anderson Mesa || LONEOS || — || align=right | 1.3 km || 
|-id=933 bgcolor=#E9E9E9
| 446933 ||  || — || December 5, 2002 || Socorro || LINEAR || — || align=right | 2.2 km || 
|-id=934 bgcolor=#fefefe
| 446934 ||  || — || December 5, 2002 || Socorro || LINEAR || — || align=right data-sort-value="0.80" | 800 m || 
|-id=935 bgcolor=#FFC2E0
| 446935 ||  || — || December 10, 2002 || Socorro || LINEAR || AMO +1kmcritical || align=right data-sort-value="0.85" | 850 m || 
|-id=936 bgcolor=#fefefe
| 446936 ||  || — || December 10, 2002 || Socorro || LINEAR || H || align=right data-sort-value="0.98" | 980 m || 
|-id=937 bgcolor=#E9E9E9
| 446937 ||  || — || December 10, 2002 || Palomar || NEAT || — || align=right | 2.3 km || 
|-id=938 bgcolor=#FFC2E0
| 446938 ||  || — || December 31, 2002 || Socorro || LINEAR || AMO || align=right data-sort-value="0.36" | 360 m || 
|-id=939 bgcolor=#E9E9E9
| 446939 ||  || — || December 9, 2002 || Kitt Peak || Spacewatch || — || align=right | 1.7 km || 
|-id=940 bgcolor=#fefefe
| 446940 ||  || — || January 26, 2003 || Palomar || NEAT || — || align=right data-sort-value="0.73" | 730 m || 
|-id=941 bgcolor=#E9E9E9
| 446941 ||  || — || January 30, 2003 || Anderson Mesa || LONEOS || — || align=right | 2.1 km || 
|-id=942 bgcolor=#fefefe
| 446942 ||  || — || March 23, 2003 || Kitt Peak || Spacewatch || — || align=right data-sort-value="0.90" | 900 m || 
|-id=943 bgcolor=#fefefe
| 446943 ||  || — || March 23, 2003 || Kitt Peak || Spacewatch || — || align=right data-sort-value="0.74" | 740 m || 
|-id=944 bgcolor=#fefefe
| 446944 ||  || — || March 23, 2003 || Catalina || CSS || — || align=right data-sort-value="0.80" | 800 m || 
|-id=945 bgcolor=#fefefe
| 446945 ||  || — || March 24, 2003 || Kitt Peak || Spacewatch || NYS || align=right data-sort-value="0.52" | 520 m || 
|-id=946 bgcolor=#fefefe
| 446946 ||  || — || April 7, 2003 || Kitt Peak || Spacewatch || — || align=right | 1.4 km || 
|-id=947 bgcolor=#d6d6d6
| 446947 ||  || — || April 30, 2003 || Kitt Peak || Spacewatch || — || align=right | 3.1 km || 
|-id=948 bgcolor=#d6d6d6
| 446948 ||  || — || May 1, 2003 || Kitt Peak || Spacewatch || — || align=right | 2.9 km || 
|-id=949 bgcolor=#d6d6d6
| 446949 ||  || — || June 1, 2003 || Cerro Tololo || M. W. Buie || critical || align=right | 1.5 km || 
|-id=950 bgcolor=#d6d6d6
| 446950 ||  || — || June 26, 2003 || Haleakala || NEAT || — || align=right | 3.4 km || 
|-id=951 bgcolor=#d6d6d6
| 446951 ||  || — || September 1, 2003 || Socorro || LINEAR || — || align=right | 4.2 km || 
|-id=952 bgcolor=#d6d6d6
| 446952 ||  || — || September 15, 2003 || Palomar || NEAT || Tj (2.99) || align=right | 3.5 km || 
|-id=953 bgcolor=#fefefe
| 446953 ||  || — || September 16, 2003 || Kitt Peak || Spacewatch || — || align=right data-sort-value="0.71" | 710 m || 
|-id=954 bgcolor=#d6d6d6
| 446954 ||  || — || September 16, 2003 || Socorro || LINEAR || Tj (2.92) || align=right | 4.1 km || 
|-id=955 bgcolor=#FFC2E0
| 446955 ||  || — || September 17, 2003 || Kitt Peak || Spacewatch || AMOcritical || align=right data-sort-value="0.32" | 320 m || 
|-id=956 bgcolor=#E9E9E9
| 446956 ||  || — || September 18, 2003 || Kitt Peak || Spacewatch || — || align=right data-sort-value="0.93" | 930 m || 
|-id=957 bgcolor=#E9E9E9
| 446957 Priellekornélia ||  ||  || September 19, 2003 || Piszkéstető || K. Sárneczky, B. Sipőcz || — || align=right data-sort-value="0.82" | 820 m || 
|-id=958 bgcolor=#E9E9E9
| 446958 ||  || — || September 19, 2003 || Kitt Peak || Spacewatch || — || align=right data-sort-value="0.78" | 780 m || 
|-id=959 bgcolor=#d6d6d6
| 446959 ||  || — || September 28, 2003 || Kitt Peak || Spacewatch || — || align=right | 3.4 km || 
|-id=960 bgcolor=#E9E9E9
| 446960 ||  || — || September 24, 2003 || Haleakala || NEAT || — || align=right data-sort-value="0.96" | 960 m || 
|-id=961 bgcolor=#d6d6d6
| 446961 ||  || — || September 26, 2003 || Apache Point || SDSS || — || align=right | 2.2 km || 
|-id=962 bgcolor=#d6d6d6
| 446962 ||  || — || September 28, 2003 || Apache Point || SDSS || — || align=right | 2.7 km || 
|-id=963 bgcolor=#FFC2E0
| 446963 ||  || — || October 1, 2003 || Kitt Peak || Spacewatch || AMO || align=right data-sort-value="0.44" | 440 m || 
|-id=964 bgcolor=#d6d6d6
| 446964 ||  || — || September 18, 2003 || Kitt Peak || Spacewatch || — || align=right | 3.4 km || 
|-id=965 bgcolor=#E9E9E9
| 446965 ||  || — || October 17, 2003 || Kitt Peak || Spacewatch || — || align=right data-sort-value="0.68" | 680 m || 
|-id=966 bgcolor=#E9E9E9
| 446966 ||  || — || October 17, 2003 || Anderson Mesa || LONEOS || — || align=right | 1.1 km || 
|-id=967 bgcolor=#E9E9E9
| 446967 ||  || — || October 20, 2003 || Socorro || LINEAR || (5) || align=right data-sort-value="0.74" | 740 m || 
|-id=968 bgcolor=#d6d6d6
| 446968 ||  || — || October 23, 2003 || Junk Bond || Junk Bond Obs. || — || align=right | 2.8 km || 
|-id=969 bgcolor=#E9E9E9
| 446969 ||  || — || October 17, 2003 || Kitt Peak || Spacewatch || — || align=right | 1.7 km || 
|-id=970 bgcolor=#E9E9E9
| 446970 ||  || — || October 18, 2003 || Kitt Peak || Spacewatch || — || align=right data-sort-value="0.62" | 620 m || 
|-id=971 bgcolor=#E9E9E9
| 446971 ||  || — || October 19, 2003 || Kitt Peak || Spacewatch || — || align=right data-sort-value="0.65" | 650 m || 
|-id=972 bgcolor=#E9E9E9
| 446972 ||  || — || October 16, 2003 || Kitt Peak || Spacewatch || — || align=right data-sort-value="0.67" | 670 m || 
|-id=973 bgcolor=#E9E9E9
| 446973 ||  || — || October 18, 2003 || Kitt Peak || Spacewatch || — || align=right data-sort-value="0.65" | 650 m || 
|-id=974 bgcolor=#E9E9E9
| 446974 ||  || — || October 18, 2003 || Apache Point || SDSS || — || align=right data-sort-value="0.55" | 550 m || 
|-id=975 bgcolor=#E9E9E9
| 446975 ||  || — || October 19, 2003 || Apache Point || SDSS || — || align=right data-sort-value="0.78" | 780 m || 
|-id=976 bgcolor=#E9E9E9
| 446976 ||  || — || October 19, 2003 || Kitt Peak || Spacewatch || — || align=right data-sort-value="0.59" | 590 m || 
|-id=977 bgcolor=#E9E9E9
| 446977 ||  || — || October 23, 2003 || Apache Point || SDSS || — || align=right data-sort-value="0.78" | 780 m || 
|-id=978 bgcolor=#E9E9E9
| 446978 ||  || — || November 19, 2003 || Kitt Peak || Spacewatch || — || align=right data-sort-value="0.97" | 970 m || 
|-id=979 bgcolor=#E9E9E9
| 446979 ||  || — || November 18, 2003 || Kitt Peak || Spacewatch || — || align=right | 1.1 km || 
|-id=980 bgcolor=#E9E9E9
| 446980 ||  || — || November 18, 2003 || Kitt Peak || Spacewatch || — || align=right data-sort-value="0.91" | 910 m || 
|-id=981 bgcolor=#E9E9E9
| 446981 ||  || — || November 19, 2003 || Kitt Peak || Spacewatch || — || align=right | 1.2 km || 
|-id=982 bgcolor=#E9E9E9
| 446982 ||  || — || November 18, 2003 || Catalina || CSS || — || align=right | 1.0 km || 
|-id=983 bgcolor=#E9E9E9
| 446983 ||  || — || November 20, 2003 || Kitt Peak || Spacewatch || — || align=right data-sort-value="0.79" | 790 m || 
|-id=984 bgcolor=#E9E9E9
| 446984 ||  || — || November 20, 2003 || Socorro || LINEAR || — || align=right | 1.1 km || 
|-id=985 bgcolor=#E9E9E9
| 446985 ||  || — || November 30, 2003 || Kitt Peak || Spacewatch || — || align=right | 1.1 km || 
|-id=986 bgcolor=#E9E9E9
| 446986 ||  || — || November 24, 2003 || Socorro || LINEAR || — || align=right | 1.5 km || 
|-id=987 bgcolor=#FA8072
| 446987 ||  || — || December 3, 2003 || Socorro || LINEAR || — || align=right | 1.6 km || 
|-id=988 bgcolor=#E9E9E9
| 446988 ||  || — || December 17, 2003 || Socorro || LINEAR || — || align=right | 1.4 km || 
|-id=989 bgcolor=#E9E9E9
| 446989 ||  || — || December 17, 2003 || Socorro || LINEAR || — || align=right | 1.1 km || 
|-id=990 bgcolor=#E9E9E9
| 446990 ||  || — || December 18, 2003 || Socorro || LINEAR || — || align=right data-sort-value="0.82" | 820 m || 
|-id=991 bgcolor=#E9E9E9
| 446991 ||  || — || December 17, 2003 || Kitt Peak || Spacewatch || — || align=right | 1.4 km || 
|-id=992 bgcolor=#E9E9E9
| 446992 ||  || — || December 16, 2003 || Catalina || CSS || — || align=right | 1.0 km || 
|-id=993 bgcolor=#E9E9E9
| 446993 ||  || — || December 19, 2003 || Kitt Peak || Spacewatch || — || align=right | 2.1 km || 
|-id=994 bgcolor=#E9E9E9
| 446994 ||  || — || December 19, 2003 || Kitt Peak || Spacewatch || — || align=right | 1.0 km || 
|-id=995 bgcolor=#E9E9E9
| 446995 ||  || — || December 27, 2003 || Socorro || LINEAR || — || align=right | 2.0 km || 
|-id=996 bgcolor=#E9E9E9
| 446996 ||  || — || December 29, 2003 || Kitt Peak || Spacewatch || EUN || align=right | 1.1 km || 
|-id=997 bgcolor=#E9E9E9
| 446997 ||  || — || January 16, 2004 || Palomar || NEAT || — || align=right data-sort-value="0.99" | 990 m || 
|-id=998 bgcolor=#E9E9E9
| 446998 ||  || — || January 31, 2004 || Socorro || LINEAR || — || align=right | 2.1 km || 
|-id=999 bgcolor=#fefefe
| 446999 ||  || — || January 16, 2004 || Kitt Peak || Spacewatch || — || align=right data-sort-value="0.43" | 430 m || 
|-id=000 bgcolor=#E9E9E9
| 447000 ||  || — || January 16, 2004 || Kitt Peak || Spacewatch || — || align=right data-sort-value="0.68" | 680 m || 
|}

References

External links 
 Discovery Circumstances: Numbered Minor Planets (445001)–(450000) (IAU Minor Planet Center)

0446